= List of Monuments of National Importance in Uttar Pradesh =

Monuments of National Importance in Uttar Pradesh. This is a list of Monuments of National Importance (ASI) as officially recognized by and available through the website of the Archaeological Survey of India in the Indian state Uttar Pradesh. The monument identifier is a combination of the abbreviation of the subdivision of the list (state, ASI circle) and the numbering as published on the website of the ASI. 741 Monuments of National Importance have been recognized by the ASI in Uttar Pradesh.

== List of monuments ==
Uttar Pradesh is subdivided into three circles:

- Agra
  - List of Monuments of National Importance in Agra district
  - List of Monuments of National Importance in Agra circle
- Lucknow
  - List of Monuments of National Importance in Lucknow circle
  - List of Monuments of National Importance in Lalitpur district
  - List of Monuments of National Importance in Lucknow circle/North
  - List of Monuments of National Importance in Lucknow circle/South
- Sarnath circle
  - List of Monuments of National Importance in Sarnath circle, Uttar Pradesh

== See also ==
- List of Monuments of National Importance in India for other Monuments of National Importance in India
- List of State Protected Monuments in Uttar Pradesh
