= List of Monuments of National Importance in Lucknow circle =

The ASI has recognized 366 Monuments of National Importance in Lucknow circle of Uttar Pradesh. For technical reasons, this list of ASI-recognized monuments in the Lucknow circle has been split into three lists:

- List of Monuments of National Importance in Lalitpur district
- List of Monuments of National Importance in the Northern districts in Lucknow circle: Ambedkar Nagar, Bahraich, Balrampur, Faizabad, Gonda, Hardoi, Kanpur, Kanpur Dehat, Kheri, Lucknow, Rae Bareli, Siddharth Nagar, Sravasti Nagar, Sultanpur and Unnao
- List of Monuments of National Importance in the Southern districts in Lucknow circle: Allahabad, Banda, Chitrakut, Fatehpur, Hamirpur, Jalaun, Jhansi, Kaushambi and Mahoba

== See also ==
- List of Monuments of National Importance in Agra district
- List of Monuments of National Importance in Agra circle
- List of Monuments of National Importance in Sarnath circle, Uttar Pradesh
- List of Monuments of National Importance in India for other Monuments of National Importance in India
- List of State Protected Monuments in Uttar Pradesh
