= Pilkhana =

Pilkhana may refer to:

- Pilkhana, Bangladesh
- Pilkhana, Uttar Pradesh
- Pilkhana, West Bengal
