= List of Monuments of National Importance in Agra circle =

The ASI has recognized 264 Monuments of National Importance in Agra circle of Uttar Pradesh. For technical reasons the Agra circle has to be split in two lists. The rest of Agra circle can be found in the list of Agra district.

Monument locations which are not marked on Google Map; are as per Government of India and Archeological Survey of India published Android App "INDIAN HERITAGE"

== List of monuments ==
| SL. No. | Description | Location | Address | District | Coordinates | Image |
|---|---|---|---|---|---|---|
| N-UP-A68 | Monuments in the memory of Captain Ronald Cameron and other soldiers. | Aligarh | | Aligarh | 27°53′58″N 78°04′16″E | Upload Photo |
| N-UP-A69 | Monument in memory of the brave men who fell at the hour of victory. | Gangiri | | Aligarh | 27°51′00″N 78°29′24″E | Upload Photo |
| N-UP-A70 | Three Mounds | Gorai Dhana, Iglas, | | Aligarh | 27°41′39″N 77°50′03″E | Upload Photo |
| N-UP-A71 | Masjid | Pilkhana | | Aligarh | 27°50′27″N 78°16′16″E | Upload Photo |
| N-UP-A72 | Khera Mound | Bajera Khera | | Aligarh | 27°49′07″N 78°13′25″E | Upload Photo |
| N-UP-A73 | Smaller Mound | Bajera Khera | | Aligarh | 27°49′16″N 78°13′34″E | Upload Photo |
| N-UP-A74 | Nagaria Khera | Shahgarh Khera, Shahgarh | | Aligarh | 27°50′30″N 78°19′33″E | Upload Photo |
| N-UP-A75 | Old Garhi or Mud Fort | Shahgarh Khera, Shahgarh | | Aligarh | 27°50′32″N 78°20′06″E | Upload Photo |
| N-UP-A76 | Sahegarh Khera | Shahgarh Khera, Shahgarh | | Aligarh | 27°50′18″N 78°20′21″E | Upload Photo |
| N-UP-A77 | Ancient site consisting of the remains of an ancient fort and an extensive Khera | Sankara | | Aligarh | 28°02′30″N 78°31′58″E | Upload Photo |
| N-UP-A78 | High isolated conical shaped mound | Sankara | | Aligarh | 28°02′25″N 78°31′46″E | Upload Photo |
| N-UP-A79 | Mound, part of which appears to be the remains of a Buddhist stupa or a temple | Sankara | | Aligarh | 28°02′24″N 78°31′50″E | Upload Photo |
| N-UP-A80 | Monument near Old Fort | Tappal | | Aligarh | 28°02′37″N 77°34′25″E | Upload Photo |
| N-UP-A81 | Tomb of Thomson Simpson | Tappal | | Aligarh | 28°02′38″N 77°34′46″E | Upload Photo |
| N-UP-A82 | Kos Minar in field no.194/1/(191/1) | Jarhaulia | | Auraiya | 26°26′23″N 79°31′20″E | Upload Photo |
| N-UP-A83 | Kos Minar in field no. 215-1 | Paighambarpur | | Auraiya | 26°26′55″N 79°29′24″E | Upload Photo |
| N-UP-A84 | Kos Minar in field no.127 | Bhagautipur | | Auraiya | 26°25′15″N 79°32′28″E | Upload Photo |
| N-UP-A85 | Gateway | Ajitma | | Auraiya | 26°33′39″N 79°18′59″E | Upload Photo |
| N-UP-A86 | Kos Minar in field no.684 and 685, Panhar | Salempur alias Sale under Revenue Mauza, Panhar | | Auraiya | 26°28′14″N 79°25′47″E | Upload Photo |
| N-UP-A87 | Ancient mound at Kasuri | Bamnauli | | Baghpat | 29°08′43″N 77°21′09″E | Upload Photo |
| N-UP-A88 | Mound known as Parasu Ram ka Khera | Alamgirpur | | Baghpat | 29°00′11″N 77°29′05″E | Upload Photo |
| N-UP-A89 | Mound known as Lakha Mandap | Barnava | | Baghpat | 29°06′41″N 77°25′43″E | Upload Photo |
| N-UP-A90 | Begum's Masjid jor three lofty domes | Aonla | | Bareilly | 28°16′35″N 79°10′17″E | Upload Photo |
| N-UP-A91 | Tomb of Hafiz-ul-Mulk Rahmet Khan, the Rohila Chief | Bareilly, Bakar Ganj | | Bareilly | 28°21′51″N 79°23′36″E | Tomb of Hafiz-ul-Mulk Rahmet Khan, the Rohila Chief More images |
| N-UP-A92 | Tomb of Hermit Shah Dana | Bareilly, BakarGanj | | Bareilly | 28°21′44″N 79°25′46″E | Upload Photo |
| N-UP-A93 | Large obelisk of red sandstone | Fateh Ganj | | Bareilly | 28°27′28″N 79°18′39″E | Upload Photo |
| N-UP-A94 | Several ancients ruined mounds in which Indo-Scythian coins are found. | Pachomi or Wahidpur Pachaumi | | Bareily | 28°10′27″N 79°34′45″E | Upload Photo |
| N-UP-A95 | Ancient Site | Ramnagar, Alampur Kot | | Bareilly | 28°22′14″N 79°07′33″E | Upload Photo |
| N-UP-A96 | Ramnagar Fort - Stupa | Ramnagar | | Bareily | 28°22′22″N 79°08′05″E | Ramnagar Fort - Stupa |
| N-UP-A97 | Mound called Chikatia Khera | Ramnagar | | Bareilly | 28°22′39″N 79°08′14″E | Upload Photo |
| N-UP-A98 | Mound to the south of the tanks known as of the Gandhan Sagar and Adisagar | Ramnagar | | Bareilly | 28°23′26″N 79°06′29″E | Upload Photo |
| N-UP-A99 | Small hillock called Katari Khera or Kottari Khera | Ramnagar | | Bareilly | 28°22′27″N 79°08′43″E | Upload Photo |
| N-UP-A100 | Stupa mound | Ramnagar | | Bareilly | 28°22′37″N 79°06′49″E | Upload Photo |
| N-UP-A101 | Two Buddhist mounds close to the Konwaru Tal | Ramnagar | | Bareilly | 28°22′48″N 79°07′51″E | Upload Photo |
| N-UP-A102 | Site near Aonla railway station | Rehtoia | | Bareilly | 28°17′47″N 79°10′08″E | Upload Photo |
| N-UP-A103 | Mordhwaj also known as Munawar Jar with lofty mound | Chandanpura | | Bijnor | 29°40′15″N 78°26′02″E | Upload Photo |
| N-UP-A104 | Fort | Chandpur | | Bijnor | 29°08′10″N 78°16′11″E | Upload Photo |
| N-UP-A105 | Mosque | Chandpur | | Bijnor | 29°08′06″N 78°16′03″E | Upload Photo |
| N-UP-A106 | Old British Cemetery | Daranagar | | Bijnor | 29°16′16″N 78°07′02″E | Upload Photo |
| N-UP-A107 | Ancient Site | Daulatabad | | Bijnor | 29°28′02″N 78°18′37″E | Upload Photo |
| N-UP-A108 | Tomb or Nawab Shujat Khan | Jahanabad | | Bijnor | 29°15′01″N 78°07′29″E | Upload Photo |
| N-UP-A109 | Jami Masjid | Mandawar | | Bijnor | 29°29′08″N 78°07′40″E | Upload Photo |
| N-UP-A110 | Well | Mandawar | | Bijnor | 29°29′04″N 78°07′32″E | Upload Photo |
| N-UP-A111 | Old Pathan Fort | Nagina | | Bijnor | 29°26′45″N 78°26′09″E | Upload Photo |
| N-UP-A112 | Cemetery of Nawab Najib-ud-Daula | Najibabad | | Bijnor | 29°36′29″N 78°20′19″E | Upload Photo |
| N-UP-A113 | Pathargarh Fort | Najibabad | | Bijnor | 29°36′40″N 78°22′07″E | Pathargarh Fort |
| N-UP-A114 | Portion of the old Palace | Najibabad | | Bijnor | 29°36′53″N 78°20′39″E | Upload Photo |
| N-UP-A115 | Tomb of Nawab Najib-ud-Daula | Najibabad | | Bijnor | 29°36′30″N 78°20′19″E | Tomb of Nawab Najib-ud-Daula |
| N-UP-A116 | Mound (Kushan king Vasudeva) | Teep | | Bijnor | | Upload Photo |
| N-UP-A117 | Dargah of Imadul Mulk alias Pisan Hari-ka-Gumbaz dated A.H. 896 | Budaun | | Budaun | 28°02′34″N 79°06′45″E | Upload Photo |
| N-UP-A118 | Jami Masjid | Budaun | | Budaun | 28°02′19″N 79°07′19″E | Jami Masjid |
| N-UP-A119 | Tomb, Mohalla Behrampur, Tomb of Ikhlas Khan | Budaun | | Budaun | 28°02′04″N 79°08′01″E | Upload Photo |
| N-UP-A120 | Tomb of Makhduman Jahan, the mother of Alaudin Alam | Budaun | | Budaun | 28°01′35″N 79°07′09″E | Upload Photo |
| N-UP-A121 | Several large tumuli (Kheras) in and about Ahar. | Ahar | | Bulandshahr | 28°28′23″N 78°14′51″E | Upload Photo |
| N-UP-A122 | Ruins of an old temple known as Chandrani-ka-Mandir | Chandouk | | Bulandshahr | 28°21′34″N 78°04′22″E | Upload Photo |
| N-UP-A123 | Balai Kot or Upper Fort | Bulandshahr | | Bulandshahr | 28°24′16″N 77°51′43″E | Balai Kot or Upper Fort |
| N-UP-A124 | Large mound known as Moti Bazaar | Bulandshahr | | Bulandshahr | | Upload Photo |
| N-UP-A125 | Two cemeteries | Bulandshahr | | Bulandshahr | | Upload Photo |
| N-UP-A126 | Masonry tank and ancient temple | Dankaur | | Bulandshahr | | Upload Photo |
| N-UP-A127 | Ahirpura mound or lesser temple mound | Indor | | Bulandshahr | | Upload Photo |
| N-UP-A128 | Kundanpura mound or the great temple mound | Indor | | Bulandshahr | | Upload Photo |
| N-UP-A129 | Lofty mound with a small village perched on the east northeastern side of it. | Indor | | Bulandshahr | | Upload Photo |
| N-UP-A130 | Khera or mound called Talapatnagari or Myaji Khera | Shikarpur | | Bulandshahr | | Upload Photo |
| N-UP-A131 | Large Mound | Atranjikhera | | Etah | 27°41′34″N 78°41′22″E | Upload Photo |
| N-UP-A132 | Khera Basundara | Basundra | | Etah | 27°28′03″N 78°32′00″E | Upload Photo |
| N-UP-A133 | Large mound dividing the village into two distinct portions known as Bilsar Pachiya and Bilsar Purva. | Bilsar | | Etah | 27°33′17″N 79°11′35″E | Upload Photo |
| N-UP-A134 | Mound containing ancient relics of the Gupta period. | Bilsar | | Etah | 27°33′17″N 79°11′40″E | Upload Photo |
| N-UP-A135 | Tombs of Colonel Gardener and his Begum | Chaoni | | Etah | 27°48′13″N 78°36′05″E | Upload Photo |
| N-UP-A136 | Remains of an old temple | Malawan | | Etah | 27°28′22″N 78°50′05″E | Upload Photo |
| N-UP-A137 | Two Mounds together with a statue, ancient sculptures and other antiquarian remains. | Noh Khas and Khera Noh | | Etah | 27°31′33″N 78°24′36″E | Upload Photo |
| N-UP-A138 | Fort | Sakit | | Etah | 27°26′06″N 78°46′36″E | Upload Photo |
| N-UP-A139 | Ruined Mosque in the old Fort | Sakit | | Etah | 27°26′08″N 78°46′37″E | Upload Photo |
| N-UP-A140 | Extensive Khera | Sarai Aghat | | Etah | 27°21′10″N 79°15′45″E | Upload Photo |
| N-UP-A141 | Sita Ramji's temple | Soron | | Etah | 27°53′39″N 78°44′56″E | Upload Photo |
| N-UP-A142 | Remains of an old Fort | Asai Khera | | Etawah | 26°41′06″N 79°03′30″E | Upload Photo |
| N-UP-A143 | Ancient fortress and site | Chakra Naga | | Etawah | 26°35′20″N 79°05′31″E | Upload Photo |
| N-UP-A144 | Gateway | Ekdil | | Etawah | 26°44′37″N 79°05′35″E | Upload Photo |
| N-UP-A145 | Jami Masjid with its appurtenances | Etawah | | Etawah | 26°46′07″N 79°00′50″E | Upload Photo |
| N-UP-A146 | Closed cemetery at all Souls Memorial Church | Fatehgarh | | Farrukhabad | 27°22′23″N 79°37′39″E | Closed cemetery at all Souls Memorial Church |
| N-UP-A147 | Closed cemetery at Fort | Fatehgarh | | Farrukhabad | 27°23′13″N 79°38′05″E | Upload Photo |
| N-UP-A148 | Closed cemetery at British Infantry lines | Fatehgarh | | Farrukhabad | | Closed cemetery at British Infantry lines |
| N-UP-A149 | Tomb of Surgeon Thomas Hamilton | Fatehgarh | | Farrukhabad | 27°22′33″N 79°37′47″E | Upload Photo |
| N-UP-A150 | Queen Victoria Memorial | Fatehgarh | | Farrukhabad | | Upload Photo |
| N-UP-A151 | Most easterly mound of the isolated tilas | Kampil | | Farrukhabad | 27°36′57″N 79°16′37″E | Upload Photo |
| N-UP-A152 | Tomb of Major Robertson (now Auraiya District, hence Lucknow Circle) | Karhar | | Auraiya | | Upload Photo |
| N-UP-A153 | Mosque and Sarai | Khudaganj | | Farrukhabad | 27°11′08″N 79°40′07″E | Mosque and Sarai More images |
| N-UP-A154 | Stone and its enclosure marking the place where the late Field Marshal Earl Roberts, P.C.K.G.etc. earned his Victoria Cross at the battle of Kali Nadi in 1857 situated in grave. | Khudaganj | | Farrukhabad | 27°11′17″N 79°39′52″E | Upload Photo |
| N-UP-A155 | Site of an old Buddhist Vihara, Extensive mound | Pakhnabihar | | Farrukhabad | 27°17′15″N 79°19′46″E | Upload Photo |
| N-UP-A156 | Extensive Mound | Pilkhana | | Farrukhabad | 27°25′43″N 79°16′33″E | Upload Photo |
| N-UP-A157 | Tomb of Nawab Rashid Khan | Maurshida-bad | | Farrukhabad | 27°33′50″N 79°21′29″E | Tomb of Nawab Rashid Khan More images |
| N-UP-A158 | Ancient Site | Sankissa | | Farrukhabad | 27°20′02″N 79°16′15″E | Ancient Site More images |
| N-UP-A159 | Tank of Naga called Karevar or Kandayat Tal | Sankissa | | Farrukhabad | 27°19′58″N 79°16′41″E | Upload Photo |
| N-UP-A160 | Tomb of Lt. Col. John Guthrie in the mud fort | Thatia | | Farrukhabad | 26°55′12″N 79°54′08″E | Upload Photo |
| N-UP-A161 | Tomb of Mohd. Khan Bangash Nawab | Farrukhabad | | Farrukhabad | 27°23′53″N 79°33′14″E | Tomb of Mohd. Khan Bangash Nawab More images |
| N-UP-A162 | Tomb of Fariduddin alias Main Fiddu | Shekupur Garhi, Rapri, Shikhohabad | | Firozabad | 26°57′51″N 78°35′37″E | Upload Photo |
| N-UP-A163 | Tomb of Nasiruddin | Shekupur Garhi, Rapri, Shikhohabad | | Firozabad | 26°57′51″N 78°35′36″E | Upload Photo |
| N-UP-A164 | Tomb of Nizammuddin | Rapri, Shikhohabad | | Firozabad | 26°57′51″N 78°35′36″E | Upload Photo |
| N-UP-A165 | Idgah | Rapri, Shikhohabad | | Firozabad | 26°57′56″N 78°35′35″E | Upload Photo |
| N-UP-A166 | Archaeological Site & Remains comprised in Survey Plot Nos. 736, 738/2, 738/3 & parts of Survey Plot Nos. 737, 738 / 1 and 738 / 1 and 738 / 4 as shown in the site plan | Gulistanpur | | Ghaziabad | | Upload Photo |
| N-UP-A167 | Raja Karan ka khera | Paragana put, Mustafabad, | | Ghaziabad | | Upload Photo |
| N-UP-A168 | Monument near Kilah railway station | Hathras | | Hathras | 27°35′39″N 78°03′37″E | Upload Photo |
| N-UP-A169 | Remains of an old Hindu temple inside the Dayaram's fort | Hathras | | Hathras | 27°35′33″N 78°03′40″E | Upload Photo |
| N-UP-A170 | Small circular mound | Lakhnu | | Hathras | 27°32′37″N 78°07′23″E | Upload Photo |
| N-UP-A171 | Mound | Lakhnu | | Hathras | | Upload Photo |
| N-UP-A172 | Monument of Major Robert Naim | Pipalgaon | | Hathras | 27°39′29″N 78°26′52″E | Upload Photo |
| N-UP-A173 | Monument in the memory of Samuel Anderson Nichterlein | Sasni | | Hathras | 27°42′14″N 78°04′49″E | Upload Photo |
| N-UP-A174 | Mound known as Gohana Khera | Sasni | | Hathras | 27°42′16″N 78°05′36″E | Upload Photo |
| N-UP-A175 | Well or Baoli known as Bah-ka-Kuan | Amroha | | Amroha | 28°56′15″N 78°26′35″E | Upload Photo |
| N-UP-A176 | Talib Khan's Tomb | Azampur | | Amroha | 29°00′32″N 78°09′51″E | Upload Photo |
| N-UP-A177 | Tomb of Abdul Ghafur Shah | Azampur | | Amroha | 29°00′37″N 78°09′45″E | Upload Photo |
| N-UP-A178 | Tomb of the grand son of Abdul Ghafur Shah and Mosque | Azampur | | Amroha | 29°00′34″N 78°10′01″E | Upload Photo |
| N-UP-A179 | Unknown Tomb | Chaudhariapur | | Kannauj | 27°02′03″N 79°56′06″E | Upload Photo |
| N-UP-A180 | Tomb of Sergeant, instructor of Musketry James Norfolk | Gursahaiganj | | Kannauj | 27°07′00″N 79°43′34″E | Upload Photo |
| N-UP-A181 | Bala Pir Tomb | Kannauj | | Kannauj | 27°03′29″N 79°55′16″E | Upload Photo |
| N-UP-A182 | Big Mosque | Kannauj | | Kannauj | 27°03′29″N 79°55′19″E | Upload Photo |
| N-UP-A183 | Kachhiriwala tomb | Kannauj | | Kannauj | 27°03′07″N 79°55′43″E | Upload Photo |
| N-UP-A184 | Mosque and the tomb of Makhdum Jahanian | Kannauj | | Kannauj | 27°03′06″N 79°55′42″E | Upload Photo |
| N-UP-A185 | Mound known as Old Fort | Kannauj | | Kannauj | 27°03′27″N 79°55′29″E | Upload Photo |
| N-UP-A186 | Outer gateway | Kannauj | | Kannauj | 27°03′29″N 79°55′20″E | Upload Photo |
| N-UP-A187 | Small mosque west of Bala Pir | Kannauj | | Kannauj | 27°03′28″N 79°55′13″E | Upload Photo |
| N-UP-A188 | Small inner gateway | Kannauj | | Kannauj | 27°03′28″N 79°55′16″E | Upload Photo |
| N-UP-A189 | Tomb of Sheikh Mohammad Mehdi | Kannauj | | Kannauj | 27°03′29″N 79°55′17″E | Upload Photo |
| N-UP-A190 | Zanana Gumbad | Kannauj | | Kannauj | 27°03′07″N 79°55′43″E | Upload Photo |
| N-UP-A191 | Closed cemetery | Mainpuri | | Mainpuri | 27°13′56″N 79°02′25″E | Upload Photo |
| N-UP-A192 | Ancient site Sujata Budh Vihar | Bajna | | Mathura | 27°31′17″N 77°38′22″E | Upload Photo |
| N-UP-A193 | Pillar with Sanskrit inscription dated samvat 1666 in the flanking tower at the Bhanakaur tank | Barsana | | Mathura | 27°38′57″N 77°22′54″E | Upload Photo |
| N-UP-A194 | Mound (Barse ka Tila) | Bhadar | | Mathura | 27°25′54″N 77°33′13″E | Upload Photo |
| N-UP-A195 | Temple of Govind Dev | Vrindavan | | Mathura | 27°34′53″N 77°41′58″E | Temple of Govind Dev More images |
| N-UP-A196 | Temple of Jugal Kishore | Vrindavan | | Mathura | 27°35′13″N 77°41′56″E | Temple of Jugal Kishore |
| N-UP-A197 | Temple of Madan Mohan | Vrindavan | | Mathura | 27°34′49″N 77°41′16″E | Temple of Madan Mohan More images |
| N-UP-A198 | Temple of Radha Ballabh | Vrindavan | | Mathura | 27°34′51″N 77°41′30″E | Temple of Radha Ballabh More images |
| N-UP-A199 | Akbari Sarai | Chhata | | Mathura | 27°43′25″N 77°30′22″E | Upload Photo |
| N-UP-A200 | Kos Minar, Mile 19 Furlong 1 | Chhata | | Mathura | 27°42′57″N 77°30′24″E | Upload Photo |
| N-UP-A201 | Kos Minar, Mile 24 Furlong 3 | Kosi Kalan | | Mathura | 27°46′35″N 77°27′35″E | Upload Photo |
| N-UP-A202 | Kos Minar, Mile 26 Furlong 7 | Kosi Kalan | | Mathura | 27°48′08″N 77°25′56″E | Upload Photo |
| N-UP-A203 | Kos Minar, Mile 29 Furlong 4 | Kotwan | | Mathura | 27°50′05″N 77°24′44″E | Upload Photo |
| N-UP-A204 | Two mounds, the second mound is known as Singer Tila | Ganeshara | | Mathura | 27°30′38″N 77°37′45″E | Upload Photo |
| N-UP-A205 | Kos Minar | Gauhari | | Mathura | 27°44′54″N 77°29′10″E | Upload Photo |
| N-UP-A206 | Mound | Jai singh pura | | Mathura | 27°31′56″N 77°40′08″E | Upload Photo |
| N-UP-A207 | Fortified Sarai with all its walls and gateways | Kosi Kalan | | Mathura | 27°47′38″N 77°26′17″E | Upload Photo |
| N-UP-A208 | Small mound locally known as Chavar | Kosi Khurd | | Mathura | 27°23′07″N 77°36′43″E | Upload Photo |
| N-UP-A209 | Mound | Kota | | Mathura | 27°32′37″N 77°38′28″E | Upload Photo |
| N-UP-A210 | Mound marking the Old Fort | Mahaaban | | Mathura | 27°25′45″N 77°44′27″E | Upload Photo |
| N-UP-A211 | Ancient Site containing fragments of images | Mant | | Mathura | 27°38′34″N 77°42′58″E | Upload Photo |
| N-UP-A212 | Ancient sculptures, carvings, images, bas-reliefs, inscriptions, stones and like objects | Mathura | | Mathura | | Upload Photo |
| N-UP-A213 | Gayatri mound | Mathura | | Mathura | 27°31′13″N 77°40′18″E | Upload Photo |
| N-UP-A214 | Girdharpur mound | Mathura | | Mathura | 27°29′12″N 77°38′18″E | Upload Photo |
| N-UP-A215 | Gopal Khera | Mathura | | Mathura | 27°29′17″N 77°40′17″E | Upload Photo |
| N-UP-A216 | Kankali Tila, Jain and Chaubara Mound | Mathura | | Mathura | 27°29′29″N 77°40′26″E | Kankali Tila, Jain and Chaubara Mound More images |
| N-UP-A217 | Kos Minar on the circular road | Mathura | | Mathura | 27°29′15″N 77°40′48″E | Upload Photo |
| N-UP-A218 | Palikhera Mound | Mathura | | Mathura | 27°28′35″N 77°36′37″E | Upload Photo |
| N-UP-A219 | Portions of Katra Mound which are not in the possession of Nazul tenants on which formerly stood a temple of Kehsavadeva which was dismantled and the site utilised for the mosque of Aurangzeb | Mathura | | Mathura | 27°30′21″N 77°40′12″E | Upload Photo |
| N-UP-A220 | Sati Burz, supposed to commemorate the Sati of the widow of Raja Biharmal of Jaipur erected by her son Raja Bhagwandas in A.D. 1570 | Mathura | | Mathura | 27°30′16″N 77°41′13″E | Upload Photo |
| N-UP-A221 | Site of ancient Pokhar (Pushkarini) | Mathura | | Mathura | 27°29′54″N 77°37′34″E | Upload Photo |
| N-UP-A222 | Ahalyaganj Mound | Mathura-Brindaban road | | Mathura | 27°32′25″N 77°40′25″E | Upload Photo |
| N-UP-A223 | Chamunda Tila | Mathura-Brindaban road | | Mathura | 27°31′11″N 77°40′14″E | Upload Photo |
| N-UP-A224 | Kos Minar, Mile 3, Furlong 5.175 from the boundary | Mathura-Delhi road | | Mathura | 27°32′09″N 77°39′16″E | Upload Photo |
| N-UP-A225 | Kos Minar, Mile 11, Furlong 5 (west of Chamah village) | Mathura-Delhi road | | Mathura | 27°37′31″N 77°34′39″E | Upload Photo |
| N-UP-A226 | Kos Minar, opposite to mile 13, Furlong 1 from road | Mathura-Delhi road | | Mathura | 27°39′07″N 77°32′53″E | Upload Photo |
| N-UP-A227 | Kos Minar, Mile 116, 400 yards from road | Mathura-Delhi road | | Mathura | 27°40′52″N 77°31′22″E | Upload Photo |
| N-UP-A228 | Kos Minar in the beginning of Dig road | Mathura-Dig road | | Mathura | 27°30′02″N 77°40′02″E | Upload Photo |
| N-UP-A229 | Ancient Site | Mora | | Mathura | 27°31′12″N 77°34′31″E | Upload Photo |
| N-UP-A230 | Extensive site containing a high mound apparently a fort with ramparts and corner turrets | Shahpur Ghosana | | Mathura | 27°31′25″N 77°44′07″E | Upload Photo |
| N-UP-A231 | Mound | Sonoth Janubi | | Mathura | 27°21′08″N 77°36′11″E | Upload Photo |
| N-UP-A232 | Ancient Mound | Adeenga | | Mathura | 27°29′09″N 77°31′40″E | Upload Photo |
| N-UP-A233 | Ancient Mound (Hathi Tila ) near Kishori Raman college | Kesopur Menoharpur | | Mathura | 27°30′00″N 77°40′26″E | Upload Photo |
| N-UP-A234 | Cemetery at the junction of Meerut - Delhi Road | At the junction of Meerut-Delhi road | | Meerut | | Upload Photo |
| N-UP-A235 | Mound known as Ulta Khera and the mound or Raghunathji | Hastinapur | | Meerut | 29°09′26″N 78°00′26″E | Upload Photo |
| N-UP-A236 | Andhra Kot, a high brick fortress supposed to have been built by Mahi | Meerut | | Meerut | | Upload Photo |
| N-UP-A237 | Cemetery of the Meerut racecourse | Meerut | | Meerut | 28°59′46″N 77°41′00″E | Upload Photo |
| N-UP-A238 | Tomb of Shah Peer | Meerut | | Meerut | 28°58′45″N 77°42′37″E | Upload Photo |
| N-UP-A239 | Begum's Palace | Sardhana | | Meerut | 29°09′12″N 77°36′53″E | Upload Photo |
| N-UP-A240 | Roman Catholic Church | Sardhana | | Meerut | 29°09′N 77°37′E | Roman Catholic Church More images |
| N-UP-A241 | Tombs or Sardhana Cemetery | Sardhana | | Meerut | 29°08′29″N 77°36′33″E | Upload Photo |
| N-UP-A242 | Two mounds (Kheras) named Khorkali and Jalapar | Servara | | Meerut | 28°47′37″N 77°42′43″E | Upload Photo |
| N-UP-A243 | Amarpati Khera | Alipur | | Sambhal | 28°27′16″N 78°40′46″E | Upload Photo |
| N-UP-A244 | Chandesvara Khera | Berni | | Sambhal | 28°31′22″N 78°51′17″E | Upload Photo |
| N-UP-A245 | Khera or Mound reputed to be the ruin or a palace Raja Vena | Berni | | Sambhal | 28°31′30″N 78°51′04″E | Upload Photo |
| N-UP-A246 | Large mound, the site of an ancient temple | Bherabharatpur | | Amroha | 28°54′30″N 78°21′46″E | Upload Photo |
| N-UP-A247 | Old Fort and its relics | Firozpur | | Sambhal | 28°36′59″N 78°36′26″E | Upload Photo |
| N-UP-A248 | Ancient Mound | Gumthal Khera | | Sambhal | 28°29′12″N 78°46′22″E | Upload Photo |
| N-UP-A249 | Large Mound | Karvar | | Moradabad | 28°35′01″N 78°50′21″E | Upload Photo |
| N-UP-A250 | Jami Masjid | Sambhal | | Sambhal | 28°34′50″N 78°34′02″E | Jami Masjid More images |
| N-UP-A251 | Mound | Sarthal Khera | | Sambhal | 28°31′33″N 78°40′57″E | Upload Photo |
| N-UP-A252 | Gateway of Karwan Sarai | Sondhan Muhammadpur | | Sambhal | 28°31′30″N 78°26′11″E | Upload Photo |
| N-UP-A253 | Mosque of Karwan Sarai | Sondhan Muhammadpur | | Sambhal | 28°31′32″N 78°26′10″E | Upload Photo |
| N-UP-A254 | Mosque and Tomb of Shah Abdul Razak and his four sons | Jinhana | | Muzaffarnagar | 29°31′15″N 77°13′24″E | Upload Photo |
| N-UP-A255 | Octagonal Well | Mujhera | | Muzaffarnagar | 29°18′37″N 77°55′40″E | Upload Photo |
| N-UP-A256 | Tomb of Diwan Saiyed Mohammad Khan | Mujhera | | Muzaffarnagar | 29°18′39″N 77°55′42″E | Upload Photo |
| N-UP-A257 | Tomb Saiyed Hussain also called Sayed Chajju Khan | Mujhera | | Muzaffarnagar | 29°18′34″N 77°55′39″E | Upload Photo |
| N-UP-A258 | Tomb of Saiyed Umar Nur Khan | Mujhera | | Muzaffarnagar | 29°18′30″N 77°55′37″E | Upload Photo |
| N-UP-A259 | Tomb of Saiyed Saif Khan and his mother | Mujhera | | Muzaffarnagar | 29°18′35″N 77°55′42″E | Upload Photo |
| N-UP-A260 | Jami Masjid | Pilibhit | | Pilibhit | 28°38′09″N 79°48′05″E | Jami Masjid More images |
| N-UP-A261 | Badshahi Bagh locally known as Badshahi Mahal | Badshahi Mahal | | Saharanpur | 30°19′39″N 77°35′41″E | Upload Photo |
| N-UP-A262 | Khera ki Bandi, Old Cemetery | Lodipur | | Saharanpur | 30°10′35″N 77°33′20″E | Upload Photo |
| N-UP-A263 | Old British Cemetery, Khata Khedi | Saharanpur | | Saharanpur | | Upload Photo |
| N-UP-A264 | Old British Cemetery, Saharanpur City | Saharanpur | | Saharanpur | 29°57′22″N 77°33′17″E | Upload Photo |

== See also ==
- List of Monuments of National Importance in Sarnath circle, Uttar Pradesh
- List of Monuments of National Importance in Lalitpur district
- List of Monuments of National Importance in Lucknow circle/North
- List of Monuments of National Importance in Lucknow circle/South
- List of Monuments of National Importance in India for other Monuments of National Importance in India
- List of State Protected Monuments in Uttar Pradesh
