= Mandawar =

Mandawar may refer to any of the following towns in India:

- Mandawar, Uttar Pradesh
- Mandawar, Rajasthan

== See also ==
- Mundawar, Rajasthan, India
- Manavadar, town in Gujarat, India
  - Manavadar (Vidhan Sabha constituency)
  - Bantva Manavadar, former princely state
