= Teemala =

Village in Uttar Pradesh, India

- village
- Interactive map of Teemala
- Coordinates: 29.5318°N 78.1425°E
- Country: India
- State: Uttar Pradesh
- District: Bijnor

Population
  - Total: 565

Teemala (also spelled Teemla, Timla) is a small village in Bijnor District, Uttar Pradesh, India. It is located between the town of Mandawar and the Chandok Road, about 5 kilometres (3.1 mi) from Mandawar.

== Demography ==
Timla has a population of about 565. Males constitute 54% of the population and females 46%. Teemla has an average literacy rate of 48%; male literacy is 52% and female literacy is 43%. In Timla, 16% of the population is under 6 years of age. The population of this village comprises Rajputs and Harijans.

Most inhabitants are farmers and depend on farming only. Very few families are dependent on government or private jobs. Most of the farmers have a good standard of living and having all modern facilities in their homes like color TV, motorcycles, and tractors.
