= Jama Masjid, Shamsi =

13th-century mosque in Budaun, India

Jama Masjid Shamsi
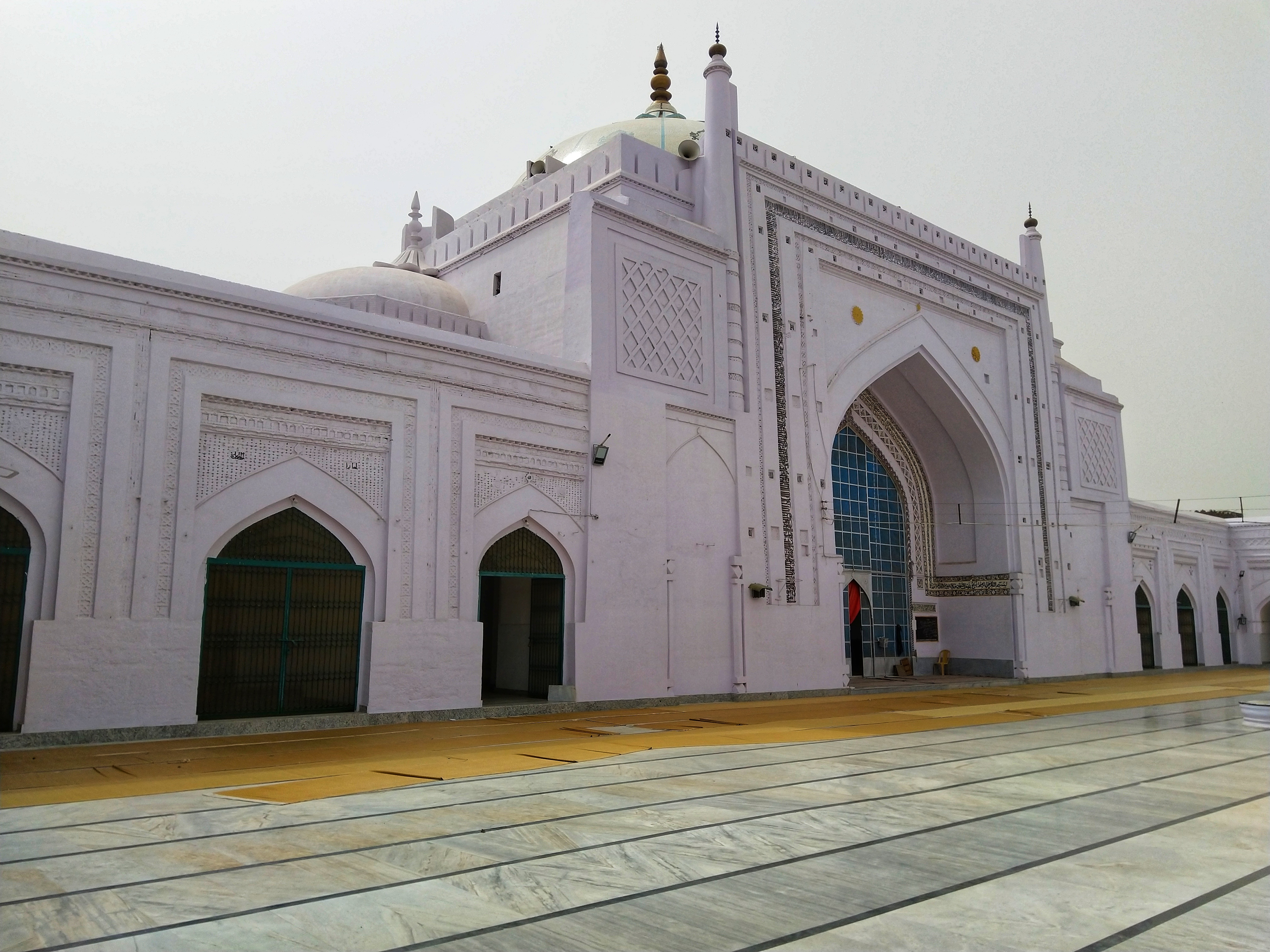
- The mosque façade in 2018

- Location of the mosque in Uttar Pradesh

Religion
- Affiliation: Islam
- Ecclesiastical or organisational status: Friday mosque
- Status: Active

Location
- Location: Budaun, Bareilly division, Uttar Pradesh
- Country: India
- Coordinates: 28°02′19″N 79°07′19″E

Architecture
- Type: Mosque architecture
- Style: Persian
- Founder: Iltutmish
- Completed: 1210 - 1223

Specifications
- Capacity: 23,500 worshippers
- Height (max): 47 m (155 ft)
- Dome: 8
- Dome dia. (outer): 11 m (36 ft)
- Dome dia. (inner): 10 m (34 ft)
- Materials: Red sandstone; white marble

Monument of National Importance
- Official name: Jami Masjid
- Reference no.: N-UP-A118
- Location of the mosque in Budaun

The Jama Masjid Shamsi (Hindi: जामा मस्जिद शम्सी), also known as the Jama Shamsi Shahi, and the Great Mosque of Budaun, is a Friday mosque built in the historic centre of Budaun, in the Bareilly division of the state of Uttar Pradesh, India.

The mosque is a Monument of National Importance, administered by the Archaeological Survey of India, and is a National Heritage Site.

== Architecture ==
The mosque was built in the 13th century by Iltutmish, the ruler of the Delhi Sultanate at that time. The style of the mosque echoes Persian and Afghan architecture. It has three gates: the main gate, facing Shakeel Road, is made of red marble and is 30 metres (100 ft) high. The second gate is in Farshori Tola and the third one in Sotha. It has a central dome surrounded by two more domes and five other domes. The floor is made from white marble (SangeMarMar). It has a hauz (pond) and three wuzukhana on its premises. Two sides of the mosque are occupied by residential blocks: the Jama Masjid Quarters.

The mosque is built on an elevated area called Sotha Mohalla, and is the highest structure in the town of Budaun.

The mosque is the third-oldest existing and seventh-largest mosque in the country after Delhi's Jama Masjid, with a capacity of 23,500 worshippers. The built-up part of the mosque is larger than that of any other mosque in the country. Before the expansion of Delhi's Jama Masjid, it was the largest and most famous mosque of the country. The central dome of the mosque is the largest dome of any mosque in the country.

== Links with Hinduism ==
In October 2022, right-wing Hindu nationalist organisations claimed the site as one where a Hindu temple served as a foundation for the mosque. They called for demolishing the mosque for what they called reclaiming the site as a Hindu temple.

== Gallery ==
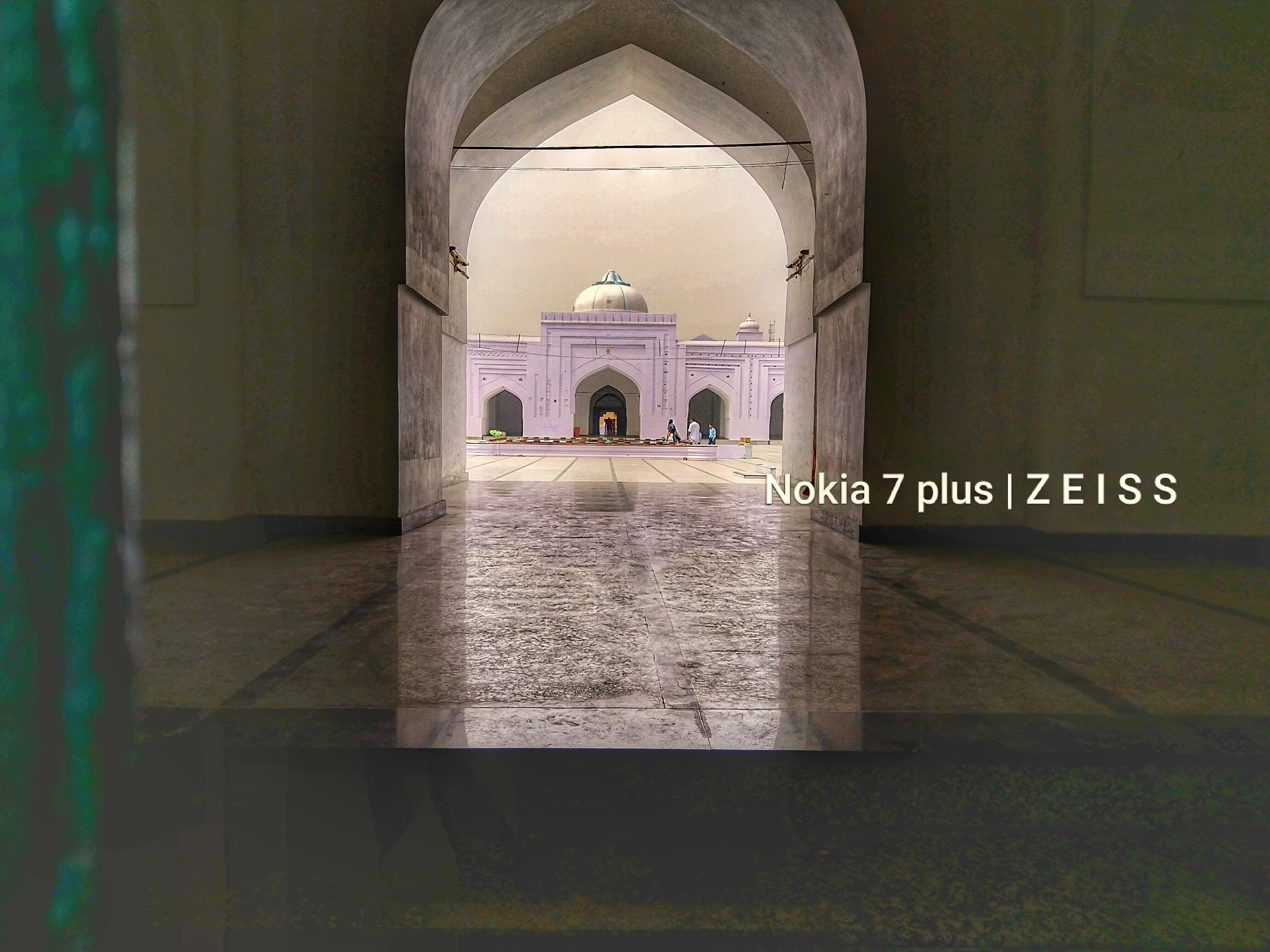
A view from door number 2, situated on either side of the mosque

== See also ==
- Islam in India
- List of mosques in India
- List of Monuments of National Importance in Agra circle
