= List of Monuments of National Importance in Lucknow circle/South =

The ASI has recognized 366 Monuments of National Importance in Lucknow circle of Uttar Pradesh. For technical reasons, this list of ASI recognized monuments in the Lucknow circle has been split into three lists:

- Lalitpur district
- Northern districts in Lucknow circle: Ambedkar Nagar, Bahraich, Balrampur, Faizabad, Gonda, Hardoi, Kanpur, Kanpur Dehat, Kheri, Lucknow, Rae Bareli, Siddharth Nagar, Sravasti Nagar, Sultanpur and Unnao
- Southern districts in Lucknow circle: Banda, Chitrakut, Fatehpur, Hamirpur, Jalaun, Jhansi, Kaushambi and Mahoba (this list) The coordinate locations of these monuments are published by ASI Circle Jhansi.

Monuments N-UP-L1 to N-UP-L15 of Prayagraj district and N-UP-L178 to N-UP-L181 have been shifted from ASI Lucknow circle to ASI Sarnath Circle. These monuments are listed at List of Monuments of National Importance in Sarnath circle, Uttar Pradesh as monuments N-UP-S1 to N-UP-S15 and N-UP-S85 to N-UP-S88.

The Centre Government has delisted 18 monuments from the list of Protected Monuments as they were found to have ceased to be of national importance as per the provisions of Ancient Monuments and Archaeological Sites and Remains Act, 1958.

== List of monuments ==
SL. No.	Description	Location	Address	District	Coordinates	Image
N-UP-L26	Baithak	Akbai		Banda		Upload Photo
N-UP-L27	Closed cemetery, Katra Naka (Delisted)	Banda		Banda		Upload Photo
N-UP-L28	Jami Masjid	Banda		Banda	25°28′13″N 80°20′18″E	Jami Masjid
N-UP-L29	Monument in memory of General whitelock's Force	Banda		Banda	25°29′25″N 80°20′10″E	Upload Photo
N-UP-L30	Baoli	Bhawanipur		Banda	25°43′58″N 80°32′15″E	Upload Photo
N-UP-L31	Approaches to Kalinjar Fort	Kalinjar		Banda	25°00′33″N 80°28′57″E	Upload Photo
N-UP-L32	Kalinjar Fort, together with the parapet walls, with the gateways and the monuments inside it.	Kalinjar		Banda	25°00′25″N 80°28′47″E	Upload Photo
N-UP-L32-a	Fort of Kalinjar: Sita Kunda	Kalinjar		Banda	25°00′08″N 80°29′17″E	Upload Photo
N-UP-L32-b	Fort of Kalinjar: Sita Sej	Kalinjar		Banda	25°00′08″N 80°29′16″E	Upload Photo
N-UP-L32-c	Fort of Kalinjar: Patalganga	Kalinjar		Banda	25°00′08″N 80°29′18″E	Upload Photo
N-UP-L32-d	Fort of Kalinjar: Pandu Kund	Kalinjar		Banda	25°00′06″N 80°29′24″E	Upload Photo
N-UP-L32-e	Fort of Kalinjar: Bhairon-ki-Jhirka	Kalinjar		Banda	24°59′37″N 80°29′25″E	Upload Photo
N-UP-L32-f	Fort of Kalinjar: Siddh-ki-gupha	Kalinjar		Banda	24°59′51″N 80°29′33″E	Upload Photo
N-UP-L32-g	Fort of Kalinjar: Bhagwan-Sej	Kalinjar		Banda	24°59′52″N 80°29′33″E	Upload Photo
N-UP-L32-h	Fort of Kalinjar: Pani-ka-aman Kund	Kalinjar		Banda	24°59′53″N 80°29′33″E	Upload Photo
N-UP-L32-i	Fort of Kalinjar: Mrigdhara	Kalinjar		Banda	24°59′43″N 80°29′11″E	Upload Photo
N-UP-L32-j	Fort of Kalinjar: Kotitirth	Kalinjar		Banda	24°59′49″N 80°29′04″E	Upload Photo
N-UP-L32-k	Fort of Kalinjar: Linga temple of Nilakantha	Kalinjar		Banda	25°00′06″N 80°28′45″E	Upload Photo
N-UP-L33	Remains of the old fort with its seven gateways. A temple of Mahadeo and an inscribed stone in Sanskrit lying on the foot and approaches to the same	Kalinjar		Banda	25°00′32″N 80°29′00″E	Upload Photo
N-UP-L34	Two inscriptions, one dated 1520, the other undated on a large basalt rock close to the bank of the Paisuni river	Ansuya ji		Chitrakut		Upload Photo
N-UP-L35	Closed cemetery	Bargarh		Chitrakut	25°09′46″N 81°27′40″E	Upload Photo
N-UP-L36	Temple	Bargarh		Chitrakut	25°06′22″N 81°27′03″E	Upload Photo
N-UP-L37	Remains of a temple, circa 10th century AD locally called Bhar Deul	Barha-Kotra		Chitrakut	25°15′55″N 81°30′11″E	Upload Photo
N-UP-L38	Small temple with a sanctum and a flat roof	Barha-Kotra		Chitrakut	25°14′57″N 81°30′24″E	Upload Photo
N-UP-L39	Two large caves known as Rikhian	Barha-Kotra		Chitrakut	25°14′57″N 81°30′28″E	Upload Photo
N-UP-L40	Remains of a small Chandella temple	Birpur		Chitrakut		Upload Photo
N-UP-L41	Two Chandella temples standing together on the same platform	Gonda		Chitrakut	25°12′11″N 80°44′40″E	Upload Photo
N-UP-L42	Remains of an old Chandella temple	Dadhwa, Rampur & Manpur		Chitrakut		Upload Photo
N-UP-L43	Balari Nath	Gulrampur		Chitrakut		Upload Photo
N-UP-L44	Two temples	Gulrampur		Chitrakut		Upload Photo
N-UP-L45	City cemetery	Karwi		Chitrakut	25°12′52″N 80°54′36″E	Upload Photo
N-UP-L46	Stone temple	Ganesh Bagh one mile south-east of Karwi		Chitrakut	25°11′44″N 80°55′06″E	Upload Photo
N-UP-L47	Temple	In the Centre of a tank near the Jail		Chitrakut	25°12′55″N 80°55′03″E	Upload Photo
N-UP-L48	Ruins of an old Jain temple called Haihaiti Mandir together with fragments of statues about the fort of the hill	Koh		Chitrakut	25°10′40″N 80°59′02″E	Upload Photo
N-UP-L49	Ruins of some Jain Temples	Lauri of Lokhari		Chitrakut	25°11′36″N 81°14′37″E	Upload Photo
N-UP-L50	Manikpur cantonment cemetery	Manikpur		Chitrakut	25°03′33″N 81°06′06″E	Upload Photo
N-UP-L51	Fort with the fortification walls and the three ruined Jain temples and one ruined Hindu temple inside the fort	Marpha		Chitrakut	25°07′06″N 80°42′16″E	Upload Photo
N-UP-L52	Two ruined temples	Mau		Chitrakut	25°15′35″N 81°21′51″E	Upload Photo
N-UP-L53	Inscribed statue of Chandella period under a pipal tree	Pura		Chitrakut	25°15′20″N 81°18′01″E	Upload Photo
N-UP-L54	Ruins of a large linga temple of the Chandella type	Pura		Chitrakut	25°15′42″N 81°18′16″E	Upload Photo
N-UP-L55	Priest’s house	Ramnagar		Chitrakut		Upload Photo
N-UP-L56	Remains of a large temple	Ramnagar		Chitrakut		Upload Photo
N-UP-L57	Ruins of a large Chandella temple	Ramnagar		Chitrakut	25°14′50″N 81°14′40″E	Upload Photo
N-UP-L58	Group of ruins, the principal object of which is the entrance door of a temple	Rasin		Chitrakut	25°10′42″N 80°41′01″E	Upload Photo
N-UP-L59	Remains of an old fort and a disused temple Devi Chandra Maheshwari	Rasin		Chitrakut	25°10′23″N 80°41′59″E	Upload Photo
N-UP-L60	Rock hewn tank, close to the temple of Chandi Maheshwari	Rasin		Chitrakut	25°10′24″N 80°41′56″E	Upload Photo
N-UP-L61	Several Sati pillars with a large standing female figure holding a child in her left arm	Rasin		Chitrakut		Upload Photo
N-UP-L62	Temple of Chandi Maheshwari	Rasin		Chitrakut		Upload Photo
N-UP-L63	Two large caves in the middle of a hillock with broken sculptures scattered about	Rauli		Chitrakut	25°13′10″N 80°42′55″E	Upload Photo
N-UP-L70	Mound called chauki	Aphui		Fatehpur	25°46′34″N 81°17′18″E	Upload Photo
N-UP-L71	Monument in the memory of A. Blakely	Asafpur		Fatehpur	26°11′21″N 80°32′54″E	Upload Photo
N-UP-L72	Large mound covered with broken bricks and pottery	Asni		Fatehpur	26°02′56″N 80°55′10″E	Upload Photo
N-UP-L73	Extensive brick-strewn mound	Asothar		Fatehpur	25°45′04″N 80°52′44″E	Upload Photo
N-UP-L74	Smaller mound bearing five large Digamber Jain figures which people call the five Pandavas	Asothar		Fatehpur	25°44′54″N 80°52′44″E	Upload Photo
N-UP-L75	Emperor Aurangzeb's Pavilion	Bagh Badshahi (Khajuha)		Fatehpur	26°03′07″N 80°31′36″E	Upload Photo
N-UP-L76	Entire compound known as Bagh Badshahi	Bagh Badshahi (Khajuha)		Fatehpur	26°03′10″N 80°31′31″E	Upload Photo
N-UP-L77	Temple	Bahua		Fatehpur	25°50′21″N 80°37′51″E	Upload Photo
N-UP-L78	Four massive masonry pillars containing stone tablets with inscriptions in Urdu and Hindi representing translations of the Ten Commandments and some verses from Saint John's Gospel, on the Grand Trunk Road just opposite the Public Works Department Inspection House on the western outskirts of the town	Fatehpur		Fatehpur	25°56′34″N 80°48′13″E	Upload Photo
N-UP-L79	Square sandstone pillar bearing an inscription of Mahipaladeva dated Samvat 974 in the Municipal Garden attached to the Town Hall	Fatehpur		Fatehpur		Upload Photo
N-UP-L80	The collection of miscellaneous antiquities from different parts of the District grouped round the Asni Pillar of Mahipaladeva in the Municipal garden attached to the Town Hall	Fatehpur		Fatehpur		Upload Photo
N-UP-L81	Hathikhana mosque or Jaichandi mosque	Hathgaon		Fatehpur	25°52′05″N 81°07′26″E	Upload Photo
N-UP-L82	Circular mound, the site of a temple	Khairai		Fatehpur	25°40′51″N 81°06′03″E	Upload Photo
N-UP-L83	Extensive mound called Garhi	Khairai		Fatehpur	25°40′46″N 81°06′19″E	Upload Photo
N-UP-L84	Monument in the memory of T.S. Powell, Col.	Kunwarpur		Fatehpur	26°00′08″N 80°41′44″E	Upload Photo
N-UP-L85	Four temples	Kurari		Fatehpur	25°51′33″N 80°39′35″E	Upload Photo
N-UP-L86	Ruins of a fort built by Jaya Chandra	Kutila		Fatehpur		Upload Photo
N-UP-L87	Old Fort	Nahar Khor		Fatehpur		Upload Photo
N-UP-L88	Old Fort	Paina Kalan		Fatehpur		Upload Photo
N-UP-L89	Extensive ruins of an ancient fortified town said to be a stronghold of the Chandella	Paina		Fatehpur	25°48′35″N 80°45′50″E	Upload Photo
N-UP-L90	Mound with many pieces of stone sculptures collected upon them	Ren		Fatehpur	25°51′41″N 80°33′28″E	Upload Photo
N-UP-L91	Ruined temple	Saton		Fatehpur	25°47′01″N 80°57′30″E	Upload Photo
N-UP-L92	Two brick Temples	Sirthar Amauli		Fatehpur	25°59′40″N 80°17′47″E	Upload Photo
N-UP-L93	Two temples	Thithaura		Fatehpur	25°54′27″N 80°39′06″E	Upload Photo
N-UP-L94	Extensive mound and a group of Hindu Sculptures	Tiksariya		Fatehpur	25°48′55″N 80°58′41″E	Upload Photo
N-UP-L95	Temple	Tindauli		Fatehpur	26°03′44″N 80°34′23″E	Upload Photo
N-UP-L97	Certain mounds covered with broken statues and sculptures	Kadhwa		Hamirpur	25°41′57″N 79°36′06″E	Upload Photo
N-UP-L98	Closed British Cemetery	Kaitha		Hamirpur	25°30′56″N 79°32′15″E	Upload Photo
N-UP-L99	Jain Temple mounds covered with broken bricks etc. and three kheras near them viz, Ladhanpur, Mirzapur and Itara	Sumerpur		Hamirpur	25°49′33″N 80°09′04″E	Upload Photo
N-UP-L113	Sanskrit Inscription of Samvat 1672 on the Chauknanda of Rupan Guru	Akbarpur or Ataura		Jalaun	26°00′57″N 79°41′28″E	Upload Photo
N-UP-L114	Cemetery	Jalaun		Jalaun		Upload Photo
N-UP-L115	Chaurasi Tomb of Lodhi Shah Badshah	Kalpi		Jalaun	26°06′50″N 79°43′38″E	Chaurasi Tomb of Lodhi Shah Badshah
N-UP-L116	Closed Cemetery	Kalpi		Jalaun	26°07′50″N 79°44′41″E	Closed Cemetery
N-UP-L117	Piece of fort wall on the north-east scarp with its circular bastion	Kalpi		Jalaun	26°07′48″N 79°44′51″E	Piece of fort wall on the north-east scarp with its circular bastion
N-UP-L118	Small domed building carried on six pillars immediately near to the P.W.D. Rest House	Kalpi		Jalaun	26°07′51″N 79°44′45″E	Small domed building carried on six pillars immediately near to the P.W.D. Rest House
N-UP-L119	Cemetery	Kunch		Jalaun	25°59′38″N 79°08′43″E	Upload Photo
N-UP-L120	Dome on twelve pillars called Bara Khamba traditionally ascribed to the commander of Prithviraja	Kunch		Jalaun	25°59′40″N 79°08′32″E	Upload Photo
N-UP-L121	Mosque	Orai		Jalaun	25°59′39″N 79°27′24″E	Upload Photo
N-UP-L122	Ruins of a large temple of the Chandella period	Bangama		Jhansi	25°23′46″N 78°40′57″E	Upload Photo
N-UP-L123	Gandai Temple	Barua-sagar		Jhansi	25°22′54″N 78°45′00″E	Upload Photo
N-UP-L124	Ghugua-ka-math	Barua-sagar		Jhansi	25°22′31″N 78°45′24″E	Upload Photo
N-UP-L125	Jarai-ka-math	Barua-sagar		Jhansi	25°23′20″N 78°42′25″E	Upload Photo
N-UP-L126	Jarao-ka-Marhia	Barua-sagar		Jhansi	25°23′10″N 78°42′28″E	Upload Photo
N-UP-L127	Tank	Barua-sagar		Jhansi	25°22′43″N 78°44′43″E	Tank
N-UP-L128	Jama Masjid	Erich		Jhansi	25°47′26″N 79°05′04″E	Upload Photo
N-UP-L129	Gharao-ka-math	Gharao		Jhansi	25°20′36″N 79°01′51″E	Upload Photo
N-UP-L130	Memorial cemetery, south of fort on Phuta Darwaza	Jhansi		Jhansi	25°27′04″N 78°34′39″E	Upload Photo
N-UP-L131	Monument of Major F.W. Pinkney, situated on the hillock near the premises of Messers Eduljee Boyce & Co.	Jhansi		Jhansi		Upload Photo
N-UP-L132	Shikhara-roofed temple called Marhia and dedicated to Gond baba	Khojra		Jhansi	25°27′21″N 78°58′54″E	Upload Photo
N-UP-L133	Remains of a Chandella temple	Kishni Khurd		Jhansi	25°16′05″N 78°49′04″E	Upload Photo
N-UP-L134	Chandela Temple	Pachwara (Gahras)		Jhansi	25°20′56″N 79°01′56″E	Upload Photo
N-UP-L135	Ruins of a large Chandella Temple containing a well-preserved statue of Vishnu	Patha-Sagauli		Jhansi		Upload Photo
N-UP-L136	Gunner Burkill's Tomb (Delisted)	Ragoon		Jhansi		Upload Photo
N-UP-L137	Chandela Temple	Sakrar		Jhansi	25°21′15″N 78°52′27″E	Upload Photo
N-UP-L138	Ruined temple at the upper end of Rai Tal on the banks of which is a roundish boulder containing two inscriptions of Samvat 1604 and 1608	Sirwabaran		Jhansi		Upload Photo
N-UP-L139	Rani Lakshmi Bai Mahal	Jhansi		Jhansi	25°27′30″N 78°34′48″E	Upload Photo
N-UP-L140	Chhatari of Raja Gangaghar Rao along with tank	Dariapur		Jhansi	25°27′30″N 78°35′26″E	Upload Photo
N-UP-L141	Jhansi Fort	Jhansi		Jhansi	25°27′29″N 78°34′32″E	Jhansi Fort
N-UP-L142	Remains of an old Chandella temple	Marha		Jhansi	25°14′40″N 79°09′57″E	Upload Photo
N-UP-L143	Temple	Marha		Jhansi		Upload Photo
N-UP-L316	Four Chandella temples and small masonry tank	Akona		Mahoba	25°13′01″N 79°37′27″E	Four Chandella temples and small masonry tank
N-UP-L317	Chakariya Dai carving of a woman with a child in her arm	Bagwa		Mahoba	25°24′04″N 80°00′44″E	Upload Photo
N-UP-L318a	Ruins of two granite temple	Charna		Mahoba	25°21′13″N 79°34′21″E	Upload Photo
N-UP-L318b	Ruins of two granite temple	Charna		Mahoba	25°20′55″N 79°34′25″E	Upload Photo
N-UP-L319	Small mound locally known as Bhainsasur with a ruined temple on the summit and old statue inside it	Chukta		Mahoba	25°14′31″N 79°17′58″E	Upload Photo
N-UP-L320	Brahm Tal, an extensive tank with embankment On this embankment is a ruined Chandella temple lake and the ruins of a baithak	Kabraia		Mahoba	25°24′59″N 80°00′05″E	Upload Photo
N-UP-L321	Ruins of a palace on a hill	Kulpahar		Mahoba	25°19′33″N 79°37′53″E	Ruins of a palace on a hill
N-UP-L322	Foundation of Temple Madau	Mahoba		Mahoba	25°17′09″N 79°52′12″E	Upload Photo
N-UP-L323	Granite pillar	Mahoba		Mahoba	25°17′17″N 79°52′11″E	Upload Photo
N-UP-L324	Five life-sized elephant statues	Mahoba		Mahoba	25°17′08″N 79°52′00″E	Upload Photo
N-UP-L325	Jama Masjid	Mahoba		Mahoba	25°17′20″N 79°52′09″E	Upload Photo
N-UP-L326	Lake of Kirat Sagar	Mahoba		Mahoba	25°17′49″N 79°51′35″E	Lake of Kirat Sagar
N-UP-L327	Lake of Madan Sagar	Mahoba		Mahoba	25°17′03″N 79°52′07″E	Upload Photo
N-UP-L328	Lake of Vijaya Sagar	Mahoba		Mahoba	25°17′52″N 79°54′48″E	Upload Photo
N-UP-L329	Palace of Raja Paramardi Deva or Parmal	Mahoba		Mahoba	25°17′19″N 79°52′14″E	Upload Photo
N-UP-L330	Small stone pillar called Alha-ki-Lat	Mahoba		Mahoba	25°17′07″N 79°52′33″E	Upload Photo
N-UP-L331	Temple of Khakra-Math in the middle of Madan Sagar	Mahoba		Mahoba	25°17′05″N 79°51′59″E	Upload Photo
N-UP-L332	Twenty-four rock-hewn images of the Tirthankara with Inscriptions dated Samavt 1206	Mahoba		Mahoba	25°16′41″N 79°52′11″E	Upload Photo
N-UP-L333	Makarbai Temple	Makarbai		Mahoba	25°21′21″N 80°00′03″E	Makarbai Temple
N-UP-L334	Ruins of a large granite temple	Makarbai		Mahoba	25°21′17″N 79°59′56″E	Upload Photo
N-UP-L335a	Two ruined granite temples	Luhari		Mahoba	25°19′21″N 79°42′24″E	Upload Photo
N-UP-L335b	Two ruined granite temples	Luhari		Mahoba	25°19′14″N 79°42′19″E	Upload Photo
N-UP-L336	Old well with an inscription of Samvat 755	Parapbari		Mahoba	25°27′52″N 79°29′41″E	Upload Photo
N-UP-L337	Large tank	Patkari		Mahoba	25°21′50″N 79°34′27″E	Upload Photo
N-UP-L338	Rahiliya temple	Rahiliya		Mahoba	25°15′51″N 79°50′35″E	Rahiliya temple
N-UP-L339	Large Chandella tank on the embankment on which stands a large ruined temple of the earliest Chandella type	Rawatpur		Mahoba	25°15′37″N 79°39′27″E	Large Chandella tank on the embankment on which stands a large ruined temple of the earliest Chandella type
N-UP-L340	Smaller temple of which the dome has fallen	Rawatpur		Mahoba	25°15′35″N 79°39′16″E	Upload Photo
N-UP-L341	Sijari Temple	Sijari		Mahoba	25°14′12″N 79°48′14″E	Upload Photo
N-UP-L342	Tank called Baratal with an Island bearing the ruins of a large Chandella temple	Srinagar		Mahoba	25°10′34″N 79°46′39″E	Upload Photo
N-UP-L343	Brahmanical temple	Sukora		Mahoba	25°23′40″N 80°04′27″E	Upload Photo
N-UP-L344	Jain temple	Sukora		Mahoba	25°23′40″N 80°04′29″E	Upload Photo
N-UP-L345	Temple, a flat-roofed building	Urwara		Mahoba	25°10′21″N 79°43′33″E	Upload Photo

== See also ==
- List of Monuments of National Importance in Agra district
- List of Monuments of National Importance in Agra circle
- List of Monuments of National Importance in Sarnath circle, Uttar Pradesh
- List of Monuments of National Importance in India for other Monuments of National Importance in India
- List of State Protected Monuments in Uttar Pradesh
