= List of Monuments of National Importance in Sarnath circle, Uttar Pradesh =

This is a list of Monuments of National Importance (ASI) as officially recognized by and available through the website of the Archaeological Survey of India in Sarnath circle of the Indian state Uttar Pradesh formed in 2013. Earlier 112 Monuments of National Importance in Uttar Pradesh were recognized by the ASI in Patna circle.

The Sarnath circle, the 27th circle of ASI, came into existence on September 2, 2013 comprising the 112 monuments of Patna Circle and 30 monuments of Lucknow Circle. As per 2019 Parliament Assurance the total is 143 monuments.

The Centre Government has delisted 18 monuments from the list of Protected Monuments as they were found to have ceased to be of national importance as per the provisions of Ancient Monuments and Archaeological Sites and Remains Act, 1958.

Monument locations which are not marked on Google Map; are as per Government of India and Archeological Survey of India published Android App "INDIAN HERITAGE"

== List of monuments ==
SL. No.	Description	Location	Address	District	Coordinates	Image
N-UP-S1	Allahabad Fort	Prayagraj		Prayagraj	25°25′48″N 81°52′36″E	Allahabad Fort More images
N-UP-S1-a	Allahabad Fort: Ashoka Pillar (Inscribed stone pillar)	Prayagraj		Prayagraj	25°25′53″N 81°52′30″E	Allahabad Fort: Ashoka Pillar (Inscribed stone pillar) More images
N-UP-S1-b	Allahabad Fort: Zanana Palace	Prayagraj		Prayagraj	25°25′46″N 81°52′37″E	Allahabad Fort: Zanana Palace More images
N-UP-S2	Cemeteries in Kydganj	Prayagraj		Prayagraj	25°26′19″N 81°51′39″E	Cemeteries in Kydganj More images
N-UP-S3	Khusru Bagh	Prayagraj		Prayagraj	25°26′31″N 81°49′13″E	Khusru Bagh More images
N-UP-S3-a	Khusru Bagh: Enclosure wall and Gateway of Khusru Bagh	Prayagraj		Prayagraj	25°26′24″N 81°49′15″E	Khusru Bagh: Enclosure wall and Gateway of Khusru Bagh More images
N-UP-S3-b	Khusru Bagh: Tomb of Bibi Tamolan	Prayagraj		Prayagraj	25°26′33″N 81°49′11″E	Khusru Bagh: Tomb of Bibi Tamolan More images
N-UP-S3-c	Khusru Bagh: Tomb of Sultan Khusru	Prayagraj		Prayagraj	25°26′32″N 81°49′20″E	Khusru Bagh: Tomb of Sultan Khusru More images
N-UP-S3-d	Khusru Bagh: Tomb of Sultan Khusru's Mother (Shah Begum, born Manbhawati Bai)	Prayagraj		Prayagraj	25°26′32″N 81°49′15″E	Khusru Bagh: Tomb of Sultan Khusru's Mother (Shah Begum, born Manbhawati Bai) More images
N-UP-S3-e	Khusru Bagh: Tomb of Nithar Begum Sultan Khusru's Sister	Prayagraj		Prayagraj	25°26′32″N 81°49′18″E	Khusru Bagh: Tomb of Nithar Begum Sultan Khusru's Sister More images
N-UP-S4	Canopy of Queen Victoria's Memorial in Chandrashekhar Azad Park (old Alfred park)	Prayagraj		Prayagraj	25°27′13″N 81°50′57″E	Canopy of Queen Victoria's Memorial in Chandrashekhar Azad Park (old Alfred park) More images
N-UP-S5	Small high mound, the ancient site of a large Hindu Temple	Bara		Prayagraj		Upload Photo
N-UP-S6	The area of the waste land divided by a ravine into two large mounds called "Garha and Garhi"	Bhita		Prayagraj	25°18′23″N 81°47′12″E	Upload Photo
N-UP-S7	Large stone dwelling house said to have been the residence of the two heroes of Aalha and Udal cir. 8th century AD	Chilla Gauhani		Prayagraj	25°18′51″N 81°42′54″E	Upload Photo
N-UP-S8	Standing figure identified by Fuhrer as Buddha Asvaghosha with a five-headed snake canopy and worshipped under the name of Srigari Devi	Deora		Prayagraj	25°19′02″N 81°47′33″E	Upload Photo
N-UP-S9	A rocky hall on the south face of the top bearing an inscription of three lines of Indo-Scythian period in red paint with some rude drawings of men and animals	Ginja Hill		Prayagraj	25°11′39″N 81°44′21″E	Upload Photo
N-UP-S10	Ruined forts of Samudra Gupta and Hansagupta	Jhusi		Prayagraj	25°25′32″N 81°54′00″E	Upload Photo
N-UP-S11	Cave known as Sita-ki-rasoi containing an inscription in characters of the 9th century AD	Mankawar		Prayagraj	25°18′25″N 81°47′58″E	Upload Photo
N-UP-S12	Garhwa fort	Sheorajpur		Prayagraj	25°13′34″N 81°35′09″E	Garhwa fort More images
N-UP-S13	Extensive mound called Hatgauha Dih	Shiupur		Prayagraj	25°32′11″N 81°48′22″E	Upload Photo
N-UP-S14	Large mound called Surya Bhita	Singraur		Prayagraj	25°35′35″N 81°38′32″E	Upload Photo
N-UP-S15	Archaeological Site and remains	Sringverpur		Prayagraj	25°35′14″N 81°38′31″E	Upload Photo
N-UP-S16	Old Nawabi Mosque	Akbarpur		Ambedkar Nagar	26°25′37″N 82°31′59″E	Upload Photo
N-UP-S17	Monuments of Captains Wilsons and Jones and eleven privates of 13th Infantry	Azamgarh		Azamgarh		Upload Photo
N-UP-S18	Mutiny Monuments	Azamgarh		Azamgarh		Upload Photo
N-UP-S19	Old British Cemetery	Azamgarh		Azamgarh	26°04′40″N 83°11′24″E	Upload Photo
N-UP-S20	Ancient site called Garba-ka-kot or Rajbhar-ka-lot	Garhwa		Azamgarh	25°57′30″N 83°20′55″E	Upload Photo
N-UP-S21	Ancient Site measuring 7 acres and 800 links in Khasra No. 384	Garhwa		Azamgarh	25°57′23″N 83°20′38″E	Upload Photo
N-UP-S22	Tomb of Abhiman	Mehnagar		Azamgarh	25°52′59″N 83°07′00″E	Upload Photo
N-UP-S23	Inscribed stone Pillar	Pakri		Azamgarh	25°45′37″N 83°08′41″E	Upload Photo
N-UP-S24	A Banyan grove containing traces of ancient building (Delisted)	Amavey		Ballia		Upload Photo
N-UP-S25	A mound 20' high apparently formed of solid brick work where the Prithvinath lingam and a copper plate grant were found	Pachran		Balrampur	27°22′46″N 81°57′26″E	Upload Photo
N-UP-S26	Long Mound	Bairant		Chandalui	25°27′10″N 83°15′09″E	Upload Photo
N-UP-S27	Small conical mound of ruins called Devi-ka-sthan	Bairant		Chandalui	25°27′11″N 83°15′05″E	Upload Photo
N-UP-S28	Ancient site consisting of ruined fort	Bairant		Chandalui		Upload Photo
N-UP-S29	Large rectangular shaped mound	Bairant		Chandalui	25°27′12″N 83°15′13″E	Upload Photo
N-UP-S30	Large mound of brick ruins	Dhanapur		Chandalui	25°27′01″N 83°20′57″E	Upload Photo
N-UP-S31	Three sites with megaliths on the western and north eastern of the hill	Hathinia Hill		Chandalui	25°01′18″N 83°09′57″E	Upload Photo
N-UP-S32	Khera or Mound representing the ancient Sukalpura	Sukalpura		Chandalui	25°19′45″N 83°15′38″E	Upload Photo
N-UP-S33	Conical Stupa-shaped mound	Amaoni		Deoria	26°28′35″N 83°36′37″E	Upload Photo
N-UP-S34	Inscribed Monolith of rough grey sandstone remains locally known as 'Lat' or 'Gada' of Parasram	Bhagalpur		Deoria	26°10′14″N 83°52′08″E	Upload Photo
N-UP-S35	Inscribed stone pillar	Kahaon (ancient Kakubha)		Deoria	26°16′09″N 83°51′16″E	Upload Photo
N-UP-S36	Two ruined Temples	Kahaon		Deoria	26°16′07″N 83°51′23″E	Upload Photo
N-UP-S37	Ancient Site	Khukhunda and Sajhwar		Deoria	26°23′44″N 83°51′24″E	Upload Photo
N-UP-S38	Long low mound of ruins	Khukhunda		Deoria	26°23′46″N 83°51′20″E	Upload Photo
N-UP-S39	Ancient Site	Rudarpur		Deoria	26°27′40″N 83°36′34″E	Upload Photo
N-UP-S40	High square shaped mound	Rudarpur		Deoria	26°27′41″N 83°36′14″E	Upload Photo
N-UP-S41	Extensive mound	Sohnag		Deoria	26°08′27″N 83°53′50″E	Upload Photo
N-UP-S42	Dih or mound apparently the remains of a Buddhist stupa	Tarakulwa		Deoria	26°37′44″N 83°53′24″E	Upload Photo
N-UP-S43	Three mounds known as Mani-Parbat, Kuber Parbat and Sugrib Parbat	Ayodhya		Ayodhya	26°47′36″N 82°11′59″E	Upload Photo
N-UP-S44	Bani Khanam's Tomb	Faizabad		Ayodhya	26°47′30″N 82°08′39″E	Upload Photo
N-UP-S45	Gulab Bari	Faizabad		Ayodhya	26°46′48″N 82°09′27″E	Gulab Bari More images
N-UP-S46	Tomb of Bahu-Begum	Faizabad		Ayodhya	26°45′58″N 82°08′41″E	Tomb of Bahu-Begum More images
N-UP-S47	Tomb of Hazi Iqbal, Eunuch of Sadar Jahan Begum including the mosque & the whole compound enclosing them	Faizabad		Ayodhya	26°46′44″N 82°10′33″E	Upload Photo
N-UP-S48	Tomb of Shuja-ud-daula	Faizabad		Ayodhya	26°46′48″N 82°09′27″E	Tomb of Shuja-ud-daula More images
N-UP-S49	Mound known as Masaon-Dih	Aonrihar		Ghazipur	25°33′10″N 83°12′20″E	Upload Photo
N-UP-S50	Bridge on the Ganga Nadi	Bhimapur		Ghazipur	25°36′52″N 83°12′05″E	Upload Photo
N-UP-S51	Bhitari Gupta-pillar with an inscription of Skanda-Gupta standing in the ruined fort	Bhitari		Ghazipur	25°33′51″N 83°17′23″E	Upload Photo
N-UP-S52	Entire ruined fort enclosure with projecting corners towers and numerous mounds	Bhitari		Ghazipur	25°34′16″N 83°17′07″E	Upload Photo
N-UP-S53	Remains of the Gupta period	Bhitari		Ghazipur	25°34′20″N 83°17′21″E	Upload Photo
N-UP-S54	Mound of ruins with remains of temples and other buildings	Dildarnagar		Ghazipur	25°25′49″N 83°39′54″E	Upload Photo
N-UP-S55	Dih or mound of ruins called Suiri-ka-Raj	Ghazipur		Ghazipur	25°31′41″N 83°29′22″E	Upload Photo
N-UP-S56	Lord Cornwallis Tomb	Ghazipur		Ghazipur	25°33′32″N 83°32′45″E	Lord Cornwallis Tomb More images
N-UP-S57	Stone lat or pillar standing on the Western end of a mound of brick ruins and the capital the pillar lying on the ground closeby.	Latiya		Ghazipur	25°23′45″N 83°34′36″E	Upload Photo
N-UP-S58	High Khera	Masaondi		Ghazipur		Upload Photo
N-UP-S59	Mound of ruins	Masaondi		Ghazipur	25°32′20″N 83°11′54″E	Upload Photo
N-UP-S60	Two statues representing Varaha or the Boar incarnation and Krishan with Gopis	Saidpur		Ghazipur	25°32′18″N 83°11′26″E	Upload Photo
N-UP-S61	Extensive brick-builder	Shaikhanpur		Ghazipur	25°43′57″N 83°39′48″E	Upload Photo
N-UP-S62	Mound covered with bricks with the ruins of the temple of Asokanath Mahadeva	Hathili		Gonda	26°59′37″N 82°06′21″E	Upload Photo
N-UP-S63	Extensive remains of a very large ancient city	Barhi		Gorakhpur	26°39′35″N 83°34′38″E	Upload Photo
N-UP-S64	A Series of enormous mounds	Barhiapur or Bhadar Khas		Gorakhpur	26°33′04″N 83°12′01″E	Upload Photo
N-UP-S65	Three high conical mounds of brick which are evidently the ruins of stupas	Chaora		Gorakhpur	26°39′34″N 83°33′03″E	Upload Photo
N-UP-S66	Extensive Mound	Gopalpur		Gorakhpur	26°21′03″N 83°21′19″E	Upload Photo
N-UP-S67	Large and high mound, the ruins of the ancient Domangarh	Gorakhpur		Gorakhpur	26°45′43″N 83°20′02″E	Upload Photo
N-UP-S68	Ancient site covered with mounds of brick ruins and containing an ancient masonry well	Gugaha		Gorakhpur	26°26′26″N 83°26′20″E	Upload Photo
N-UP-S69	Atala Masjid	Jaunpur		Jaunpur	25°45′10″N 82°41′26″E	Atala Masjid More images
N-UP-S70	Cemetery of seven kings of the Sharqi Dynasty	Jaunpur		Jaunpur	25°45′01″N 82°41′36″E	Upload Photo
N-UP-S71	Fort	Jaunpur		Jaunpur	25°44′59″N 82°41′19″E	Fort More images
N-UP-S72	Hamam or bathhouse in the Old Fort	Jaunpur		Jaunpur	25°44′57″N 82°41′17″E	Hamam or bathhouse in the Old Fort More images
N-UP-S73	Jhanjhari Masjid	Jaunpur		Jaunpur	25°44′36″N 82°42′03″E	Upload Photo
N-UP-S74	Juma Masjid	Jaunpur		Jaunpur	25°45′33″N 82°41′06″E	Upload Photo
N-UP-S75	Khalis Mukhalis or Chan Ungli Masjid	Jaunpur		Jaunpur	25°45′28″N 82°40′21″E	Upload Photo
N-UP-S76	Khanqah or tombs of Sharqi kings of Jaunpur and the chamber for the royal mourner	Jaunpur		Jaunpur	25°45′35″N 82°41′06″E	Upload Photo
N-UP-S77	Lal masjid (Lal Darwaja)	Jaunpur		Jaunpur	25°46′12″N 82°40′14″E	Upload Photo
N-UP-S78	Qalich Khan ka Maqbara	Jaunpur		Jaunpur	25°44′53″N 82°40′09″E	Upload Photo
N-UP-S79	Rouza of Shah Firoz	Jaunpur		Jaunpur	25°44′55″N 82°41′53″E	Upload Photo
N-UP-S80	Stone group of a gigantic lion standing on a small elephant. It is lying on Akbar's bridge.	Jaunpur		Jaunpur	25°44′54″N 82°41′04″E	Upload Photo
N-UP-S81	Tomb of Nawab Ghazi Khan	Jaunpur	Sarai mujahid	Jaunpur	25°44′58″N 82°40′45″E	Upload Photo
N-UP-S82	Gateway of Hazrat Chirag-i-Hiud's Palace	Zafrabad		Jaunpur	25°41′50″N 82°44′03″E	Upload Photo
N-UP-S83	Sheikh Burhan's Mosque	Zafrabad		Jaunpur		Upload Photo
N-UP-S84	Walls of the old Kankar Fort of Jayachandra	Zafrabad		Jaunpur	25°41′44″N 82°43′53″E	Upload Photo
N-UP-S85	Fort attributed to Jay Chandra	Karra		Kaushambi	25°41′57″N 81°22′05″E	Upload Photo
N-UP-S86	Ancient fortress (representing the ancient Kaushambi)	Kosam		Kaushambi	25°20′43″N 81°23′13″E	Upload Photo
N-UP-S87	Artificial cave in the fane of the hill of Pabhosa hill	Pabhosa		Kaushambi	25°21′14″N 81°18′55″E	Upload Photo
N-UP-S88	Traces of a large brick building on the summit of Pabhosa hill	Pabhosa		Kaushambi	25°21′19″N 81°19′02″E	Upload Photo
N-UP-S89	Circular shaped mound and the remains of a stupa	Chetiaon		Kushinagar	26°40′30″N 84°02′20″E	Upload Photo
N-UP-S90	Large dih or mound	Chetiaon		Kushinagar	26°40′30″N 84°02′17″E	Upload Photo
N-UP-S91	Large flat-topped mound of ruins called Jharmatiya	Chetiaon		Kushinagar	26°41′38″N 84°06′32″E	Upload Photo
N-UP-S92	Mound of Brick ruins called Asmanpur dih	Chetiaon		Kushinagar	26°37′40″N 84°02′29″E	Upload Photo
N-UP-S93	Mound of ruins called Sareya	Chetiaon		Kushinagar	26°41′08″N 84°00′22″E	Upload Photo
N-UP-S94	Mound in eastern extension of the stupa site at S.No.3	Chetiaon		Kushinagar	26°40′36″N 84°02′35″E	Upload Photo
N-UP-S95	Ancient site known as Fazilnagar ka kot	Fazilnnagar		Kushinagar	26°41′02″N 84°03′18″E	Upload Photo
N-UP-S96	1) A lofty mound of solid brickwork, called deisthan or Rambhar Bhavani 2) An oblong mound called the fort of Matha Kuar which is covered with broken bricks and on which stands a much ruined brick stupa, a large statue of buddha, the ascetic; a colossal statue representing Buddha's Nirvan 3) A low square mound covered with broken bricks near the barrows scattered over plain to the north and east of the great mound	Kasia		Kushinagar	26°44′21″N 83°53′27″E	1) A lofty mound of solid brickwork, called deisthan or Rambhar Bhavani 2) An oblong mound called the fort of Matha Kuar which is covered with broken bricks and on which stands a much ruined brick stupa, a large statue of buddha, the ascetic; a colossal statue representing Buddha's Nirvan 3) A low square mound covered with broken bricks near the barrows scattered over plain to the north and east of the great mound More images
N-UP-S97	Large mound covered with broken bricks and a few statues	Padrauna		Kushinagar	26°53′07″N 83°58′34″E	Upload Photo
N-UP-S98	Mound of brick ruins	Sahiya		Kushinagar	26°08′30″N 83°54′07″E	Upload Photo
N-UP-S99	Ancient Site	Ghosi		Mau	26°06′29″N 83°32′10″E	Upload Photo
N-UP-S100	Ancient site and archaeological remains	Radrauli		Maharjganj	27°19′32″N 83°25′16″E	Upload Photo
N-UP-S101	Several caves in the Top Hill	Adhesar		Mirza pur	24°37′58″N 82°18′48″E	Upload Photo
N-UP-S102	Ruined Stone Fort Lalitpur	Ahraura		Mirza pur	24°59′06″N 83°02′00″E	Upload Photo
N-UP-S103	Bhardari Devi ka Pahar containing Asokan inscription	Ahravrakhas		Mirza pur	25°02′11″N 83°02′14″E	Upload Photo
N-UP-S104	Remains of Three Small Linga Temple circa 1000AD.(Delisted)	Ahugi		Mirza pur		Upload Photo
N-UP-S105	Ruins of a Saiva Temple	Ahugi		Mirza pur	24°47′17″N 82°18′33″E	Upload Photo
N-UP-S106	Inscribed Pillar	Belkhara		Mirza pur	25°00′03″N 83°02′12″E	Upload Photo
N-UP-S107	Mound known as Sangram Sahi-ki--Pahari	Bhagdewar		Mirza pur	25°07′25″N 82°27′11″E	Upload Photo
N-UP-S108	Cave called khoh containing two early Kutila inscriptions on the rock inside	Bhulli		Mirza pur	25°03′25″N 83°02′43″E	Upload Photo
N-UP-S109	British Cemetery	Chunar		Mirza pur	25°07′20″N 82°52′29″E	British Cemetery More images
N-UP-S110	Durga Khoh	Chunar		Mirza pur	25°05′32″N 82°52′10″E	Upload Photo
N-UP-S111	Inscribed slab	Halliya		Mirza pur	24°49′34″N 82°19′26″E	Upload Photo
N-UP-S112	British Cemetery	Mirza pur		Mirza pur	25°11′33″N 82°53′33″E	Upload Photo
N-UP-S113	Iftekhar Khan's Tomb	Saryan Sikandarpur		Mirza pur	25°07′22″N 82°53′41″E	Upload Photo
N-UP-S114	A life sized figure locally known as Sankata Devi	Sheopur		Mirza pur	25°09′53″N 82°29′42″E	Upload Photo
N-UP-S115	British Cemetery	Sultanpur		Mirza pur	25°09′26″N 82°35′10″E	Upload Photo
N-UP-S116	Remains of temple on an island in the bed of the river at Ramgayaghat including two inscribed stones	Vindhyachal		Mirza pur	25°10′21″N 82°29′31″E	Upload Photo
N-UP-S117	Fragments of sculptures, one of which is a Krishnasthambha lying on the bank of the Ganga on a chabutra at the Ramgaya ghat.	Vindhyachal		Mirza pur	25°10′16″N 82°29′27″E	Upload Photo
N-UP-S118	Kantil Fort	Vindhyachal		Mirza pur	25°09′29″N 82°31′14″E	Upload Photo
N-UP-S119	Kharasthi Devi remains of a Mediaeval Temple	Vindhyachal		Mirza pur	25°09′42″N 82°29′05″E	Upload Photo
N-UP-S120	British Cemetery	Gopiganj		Santravidas nagar		Upload Photo
N-UP-S121	Ancient Site	Jungle Belhar		Siddharth Nagar	26°57′36″N 83°01′37″E	Upload Photo
N-UP-S122	Pakka masonry Fort	Vijay Garh		Sonbhadra		Pakka masonry Fort More images
N-UP-S123	Mosque	Isauli		Sultanpur	26°24′21″N 81°50′59″E	Upload Photo
N-UP-S124	Large dih called Majhangaon with brick-towers on the four corners	Sultanpur		Sultanpur	26°16′52″N 82°04′55″E	Upload Photo
N-UP-S125	Cemetery	Chaitganj		Varanasi	25°18′26″N 82°59′05″E	Upload Photo
N-UP-S126	Remains of a Fine Massive brick fort	Chandravati		Varanasi	25°27′50″N 83°07′46″E	Remains of a Fine Massive brick fort
N-UP-S127	Ancient Buddhist Site known as Chaukhandi Stupa	Ganj and Baraipur		Varanasi	25°22′26″N 83°01′25″E	Ancient Buddhist Site known as Chaukhandi Stupa More images
N-UP-S128	Old Ruined Kot (Fortress)	Hetampur		Varanasi	25°23′38″N 83°20′50″E	Upload Photo
N-UP-S129	Ancient buddhist site of Sarnath, including the Dhamek Stupa, Jagat Singh Stupa, the monastery and all the monuments excavated by Mr. Certal in 1984-85 with an area of 53.04 acres, including government land measuring 21.94 acres	Paraipur, Khajuhi Ganj(Varanasi)		Varanasi	25°22′51″N 83°01′28″E	Ancient buddhist site of Sarnath, including the Dhamek Stupa, Jagat Singh Stupa, the monastery and all the monuments excavated by Mr. Certal in 1984-85 with an area of 53.04 acres, including government land measuring 21.94 acres More images
N-UP-S130	Closed Cemetery	Rajghat		Varanasi	25°19′50″N 83°02′17″E	Upload Photo
N-UP-S131	Tomb of Lal Khan	Rajghat		Varanasi	25°19′34″N 83°02′05″E	Tomb of Lal Khan More images
N-UP-S132	The whole area to the east of the Buddhist site explored by the Archaeological department extending up to the limits of the lake named Narokhar	Sarnath		Varanasi	25°22′50″N 83°01′53″E	The whole area to the east of the Buddhist site explored by the Archaeological department extending up to the limits of the lake named Narokhar More images
N-UP-S133	Graves of European Officers	Shivala		Varanasi		Upload Photo
N-UP-S134	Ancient Mound	Tilmapur		Varanasi	25°21′53″N 83°02′21″E	Ancient Mound More images
N-UP-S135	Dharahra Mosque (Aurangzeb Mosque )	Varanasi		Varanasi	25°18′55″N 83°01′04″E	Upload Photo
N-UP-S136	Lt. Col. Pogson's Tomb	Varanasi		Varanasi	25°19′13″N 82°58′13″E	Upload Photo
N-UP-S137	Mutiny Monuments	Varanasi		Varanasi		Upload Photo
N-UP-S138	Observatory of Mansingh	Varanasi		Varanasi	25°18′27″N 83°00′39″E	Observatory of Mansingh More images
N-UP-S139	Pahlapur inscribed Lat or monolith now standing in the compound of the Queen's College	Varanasi		Varanasi	25°19′47″N 82°59′51″E	Pahlapur inscribed Lat or monolith now standing in the compound of the Queen's College More images
N-UP-S140	Tablet on the Treasury Building (Delisted)	Varanasi		Varanasi		Upload Photo
N-UP-S141	Telia Nala Buddhist Ruins (Delisted)	Varanasi		Varanasi		Upload Photo
N-UP-S142	Two Graves at Old Artillery lines	Varanasi		Varanasi	25°19′31″N 82°58′38″E	Upload Photo
N-UP-S143	Victoria Memorial	Varanasi		Varanasi	25°18′53″N 83°00′16″E	Victoria Memorial More images

== See also ==
- List of Monuments of National Importance in Lalitpur district
- List of Monuments of National Importance in Lucknow circle/North
- List of Monuments of National Importance in Lucknow circle/South
- List of Monuments of National Importance in Agra district
- List of Monuments of National Importance in Agra circle
- List of Monuments of National Importance in India for other Monuments of National Importance in India
- List of State Protected Monuments in Uttar Pradesh
