= Chaurasi Gumbad =

Coordinates: 26°06′50″N 79°43′38″E

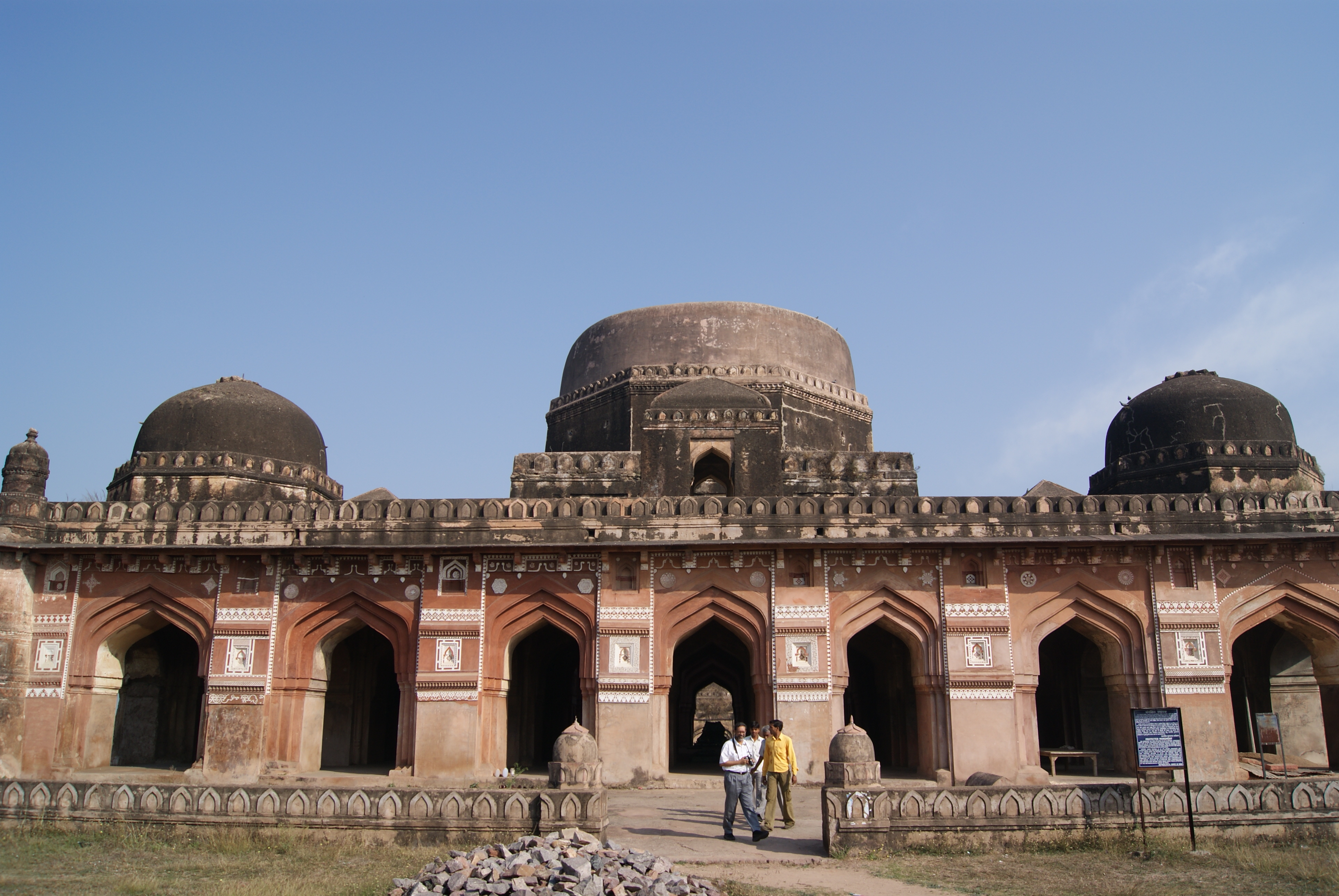
- Interactive map of Chaurasi Gumbad
- Location: Kalpi, Uttar Pradesh

Monument of National Importance
- Official name: Chaurasi Tomb of Lodhi Shah Badshah
- Reference no.: N-UP-L115

Chaurasi Gumbad is a mausoleum located in Kalpi, in the Indian state of Uttar Pradesh.

== Etymology ==
Chaurasi Gumbad literally means eighty-four domes. This is a misnomer, as the number of domes in the building is only nine. Edmund Smith points out that cloisters had existed around the building, divided into 80 compartments with groined roofs. If the four domes at the corners are added to this number, the number 84 is obtained. Upon facing these cloisters from all four directions, 21 bays are seen for each direction, making the total 84. The number of openings in the ground floor of the building is also 84.

== Description ==
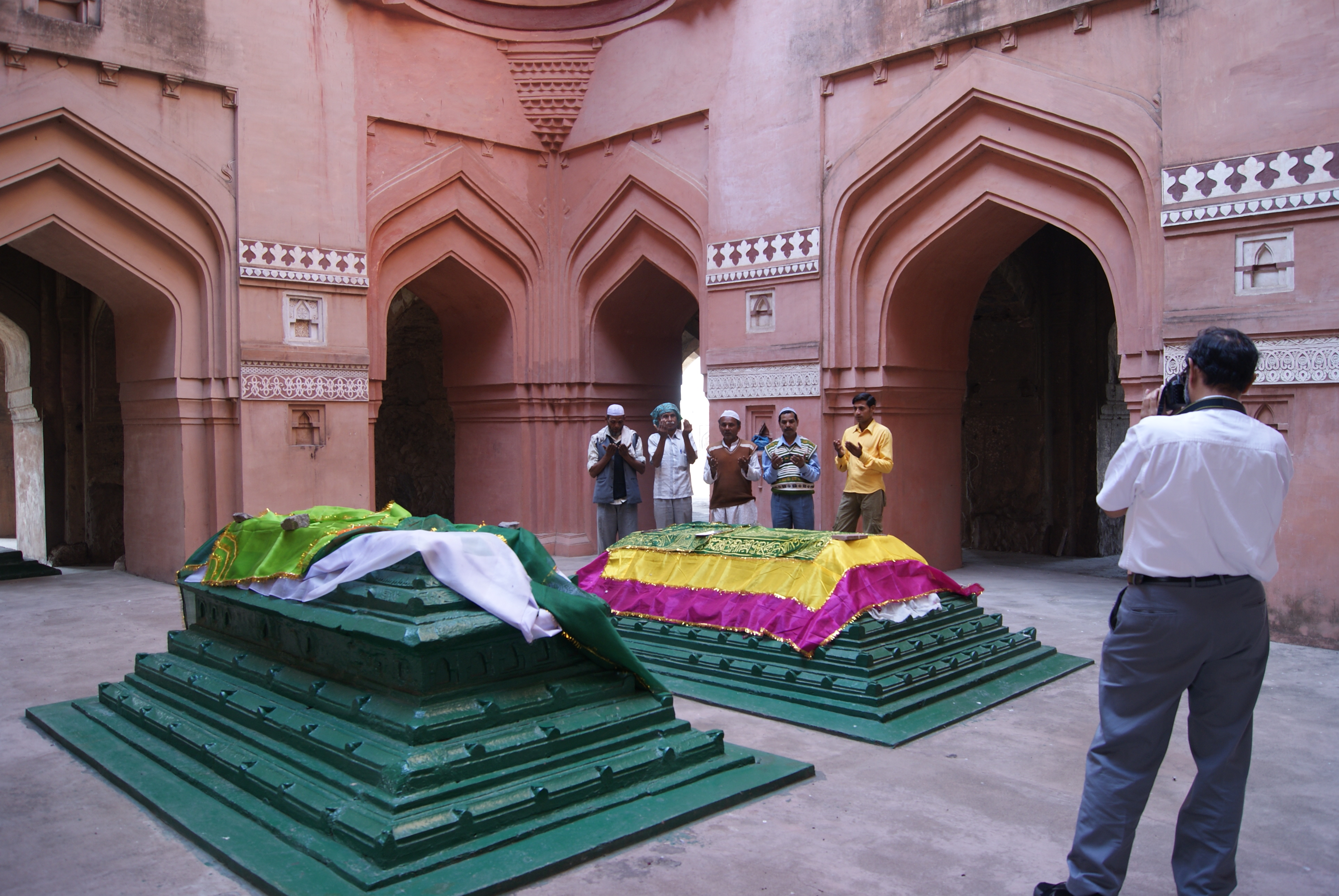
A group of people seen supplicating at the graves within the mausoleum

The plan of the building is square. It stands upon a plinth, and at the middle of a quadrangle which used to be surrounded by cloisters. The construction material used for the walls is red sandstone, with blocks of kankar set in lime mortar. Stucco is used for exterior decoration, while the chajjas are built of stone. All four facades are identical in design, except for slight variations in detail. At each orner is a tapering bastion in the typical Lodi style, with the bastion at the north-western corner being more ornate than the others. Its chief architectural feature was the central dome, which is now in a dilapidated state.

It is known as the mausoleum of "Lodi Shah Badshah", and sometimes incorrectly ascribed to Sikandar Lodi, who is actually buried at his tomb in Delhi. It probably belongs to Mahmud Shah Lodi, who was sent by Firoz Shah Tughlaq to quell a rebellion in Bundelkhand.
