= List of Monuments of National Importance in Lalitpur district, India =

The ASI has recognized 366 Monuments of National Importance in Lucknow circle of Uttar Pradesh. For technical reasons, this list of Archaeological Survey of India recognized monuments in the Lucknow circle has been split into three lists:

- Lalitpur district (this list)The coordinate locations of these monuments are published by ASI Circle Jhansi.
- Northern districts in Lucknow circle: Ambedkar Nagar, Bahraich, Balrampur, Faizabad, Gonda, Hardoi, Kanpur Nagar, Kanpur Dehat, Kheri, Lucknow, Rae Bareli, Siddharthnagar, Shravasti, Sultanpur Pratapgarh and Unnao.
- Southern districts in Lucknow circle: Allahabad, Banda, Chitrakoot, Fatehpur, Hamirpur, Jalaun, Jhansi, Kaushambi and Mahoba.

== List of monuments ==
SL. No.	Description	Location	Address	District	Coordinates	Image
N-UP-L183	Dilapidated Bundela temple with a colossal statue of Tirthankar called linga with two short inscriptions	Banpur		Lalitpur	24°41′57″N 78°44′29″E	Upload Photo
N-UP-L184	Ganes Khera, an ancient site with a large elephant headed God, who possesses eighteen hands, and measures 8’ by 4’	Banpur		Lalitpur	24°43′43″N 78°44′32″E	Upload Photo
N-UP-L185	Jain temple as per placec 60 and 6, in P.C. Mukerji’s report on the antiquities of Lalitpur, about a mile south of the village.	Banpur		Lalitpur	24°41′57″N 78°44′29″E	Upload Photo
N-UP-L186	Maniktilla, a large mound where there is a collection of interesting sculptures.	Banpur		Lalitpur	24°43′00″N 78°44′41″E	Upload Photo
N-UP-L187	Pali-Khera, a deserted site just north of the large tank	Banpur		Lalitpur	24°43′32″N 78°44′41″E	Upload Photo
N-UP-L188	Three temples, two of Vishnu and one of Linga Mahadeva of Gondwani type	Bhadona		Lalitpur	25°02′07″N 78°22′34″E	Upload Photo
N-UP-L189	Temple of the Chandella period built mostly of granite	Bharauli		Lalitpur		Upload Photo
N-UP-L190	Temple of Sun God whose statue is inside it	Budhni		Lalitpur	24°26′13″N 78°41′39″E	Upload Photo
N-UP-L191	Bilmori Temples	Chandpur		Lalitpur	24°29′18″N 78°19′27″E	Upload Photo
N-UP-L192	Inscription slab of 13th century	Chandpur		Lalitpur		Upload Photo
N-UP-L193	Inscription slab dated samvat 1325	Chandpur		Lalitpur		Upload Photo
N-UP-L194	Jain temple	Chandpur		Lalitpur	24°29′27″N 78°19′40″E	Upload Photo
N-UP-L195	Jhammar Temple and Baoli	Chandpur		Lalitpur	24°29′41″N 78°19′44″E	Upload Photo
N-UP-L196	Sahasra Linga Temple	Chandpur		Lalitpur	24°29′23″N 78°19′23″E	Upload Photo
N-UP-L197	Small temple in the Jungle	Chandpur		Lalitpur	24°29′40″N 78°19′02″E	Upload Photo
N-UP-L198	Two monolithic pillars	Chandpur		Lalitpur	24°29′24″N 78°19′31″E	Upload Photo
N-UP-L199	Varaha, Inscribed column and ruined shrines	Chandpur		Lalitpur	24°29′26″N 78°19′22″E	Upload Photo
N-UP-L200	Vishnu and Lakshmi Narayan shrines	Chandpur		Lalitpur	24°29′31″N 78°19′37″E	Upload Photo
N-UP-L201	Vishnu temple known as Bhandaria	Chandpur		Lalitpur	24°29′18″N 78°19′27″E	Upload Photo
N-UP-L202	Small flat-roofed fane sacred to Mahadeva	Dasraran		Lalitpur	24°49′29″N 78°37′54″E	Upload Photo
N-UP-L203	Half-fallen fane of Chandi having a shrine and a porch	Daulatpur		Lalitpur	24°21′26″N 78°33′35″E	Upload Photo
N-UP-L204	Large slab of the seven Mothers with Ganesha lying on the bed of the valley below the temple Chandi	Daulatpur		Lalitpur	24°21′26″N 78°33′35″E	Upload Photo
N-UP-L205	Ghats	Deogarh		Lalitpur	24°30′49″N 78°14′30″E	Upload Photo
N-UP-L206	Gupta Dashavatar Temple	Deogarh		Lalitpur	24°31′38″N 78°14′24″E	Gupta Dashavatar Temple More images
N-UP-L207	Jain temples in Deogarh fort	Deogarh		Lalitpur	24°31′05″N 78°14′48″E	Jain temples in Deogarh fort More images
N-UP-L208	Large temple Shantinatha temple, Deogarh	Deogarh		Lalitpur	24°31′04″N 78°14′48″E	Large temple Shantinatha temple, Deogarh More images
N-UP-L209	Varaha temple	Deogarh		Lalitpur	24°30′56″N 78°14′11″E	Upload Photo
N-UP-L210	Shikhara roofed temple known as Kathoyian ki madia	Deongoul		Lalitpur	24°53′40″N 78°38′08″E	Upload Photo
N-UP-L211	Small temple with broken shikhara known as Chaturbhuji	Deongoul		Lalitpur	24°53′35″N 78°38′11″E	Upload Photo
N-UP-L212	Temple of Bhavani	Deongoul		Lalitpur	24°53′38″N 78°38′25″E	Upload Photo
N-UP-L213	Sati slab showing three-headed Mahadeva on the top and fighting scenes below	Dhongra		Lalitpur	24°22′26″N 78°37′22″E	Upload Photo
N-UP-L214	A Small temple of Sankhanath or Santanatha, with a low, flat roof, the central figure on the lintel being Vishnu on Garuda.	Dhongra		Lalitpur	24°22′35″N 78°37′11″E	Upload Photo
N-UP-L215	Chausath Yogini Temple, Dudhai -akhara	Dudhai		Lalitpur	24°25′59″N 78°23′32″E	Upload Photo
N-UP-L216	Bajrang	Dudhai		Lalitpur	24°25′29″N 78°23′02″E	Upload Photo
N-UP-L217	Banbaba	Dudhai		Lalitpur	24°25′24″N 78°23′45″E	Upload Photo
N-UP-L218	Bania-ki-Barat	Dudhai		Lalitpur	24°25′06″N 78°23′07″E	Upload Photo
N-UP-L219	Chhatri with Varaha	Dudhai		Lalitpur	24°25′37″N 78°23′22″E	Upload Photo
N-UP-L220	Jain temples	Dudhai		Lalitpur	24°25′37″N 78°23′21″E	Upload Photo
N-UP-L221	Larger Surang Vishnu Temple	Dudhai		Lalitpur	24°25′36″N 78°23′25″E	Larger Surang Vishnu Temple More images
N-UP-L222	Lesser Surang Shiva Temple	Dudhai		Lalitpur	24°25′36″N 78°23′23″E	Upload Photo
N-UP-L223	Linga or Mahadeva	Dudhai		Lalitpur	24°25′36″N 78°23′22″E	Upload Photo
N-UP-L224	Rock-cut Narasimha	Dudhai		Lalitpur	24°26′26″N 78°23′16″E	Upload Photo
N-UP-L225	Temples	Dudhai		Lalitpur	24°26′36″N 78°24′08″E	Upload Photo
N-UP-L226	Two small temples of the Godwani type of which one is sacred to Gond baba and the other to Mahadeva	Dudhai		Lalitpur	24°25′23″N 78°23′27″E	Upload Photo
N-UP-L227	Varaha near tank	Dudhai		Lalitpur	24°25′34″N 78°23′23″E	Upload Photo
N-UP-L228	Two temples and several relics (Altered and beyond recognition)	Gurha Khera		Lalitpur		Upload Photo
N-UP-L229	Northern temple consisting of a shrine and a porch sacred to Mahadeva or Linga, an inscription of Samvat 1014 over the lintel	Gurha		Lalitpur	24°23′35″N 78°38′49″E	Upload Photo
N-UP-L230	Temples dedicated to Vishnu	Gurha		Lalitpur	24°23′24″N 78°38′49″E	Upload Photo
N-UP-L231	Kuraiya Bir Temple	Kuchdon		Lalitpur	24°31′26″N 78°15′44″E	Kuraiya Bir Temple More images
N-UP-L232	Bansa Building of Firozshah's time	Lalitpur		Lalitpur	24°41′44″N 78°25′26″E	Upload Photo
N-UP-L233	Digmber jain temple no. 9 Champa Marh	Madanpur		Lalitpur	24°15′39″N 78°41′39″E	Upload Photo
N-UP-L234	Jain group of temples, on the west of the village and in the jungles. (Altered and beyond recognition)	Madanpur		Lalitpur		Upload Photo
N-UP-L235	Large temple in front of Panch Marhia	Madanpur		Lalitpur	24°15′18″N 78°41′42″E	Upload Photo
N-UP-L236	Modi Marh	Madanpur		Lalitpur	24°15′29″N 78°41′50″E	Upload Photo
N-UP-L237	Mudianior, a medieval re-arrangement of columns. (Altered and beyond recognition)	Madanpur		Lalitpur	24°15′33″N 78°41′47″E	Upload Photo
N-UP-L238	Panch Marhia	Madanpur		Lalitpur	24°15′18″N 78°41′42″E	Upload Photo
N-UP-L239	Temple of Mahadeva	Madanpur		Lalitpur	24°15′04″N 78°42′15″E	Upload Photo
N-UP-L240	Temples (Bari & Chotti Kacheries)	Madanpur		Lalitpur	24°14′56″N 78°41′43″E	Upload Photo
N-UP-L241	Two small temples, one of which is sacred to the mother of Mahavira	Madanpur		Lalitpur	24°15′10″N 78°41′50″E	Upload Photo
N-UP-L242	Ruined temple The sanctum has a statue of Trimurti	Markhera		Lalitpur	24°20′35″N 78°46′36″E	Upload Photo
N-UP-L243	Tall Sati-slab called a Caza bearing an inscription of Samvat 1348	Markhera		Lalitpur	24°21′15″N 78°46′46″E	Upload Photo
N-UP-L244	Temple	Markhera		Lalitpur	24°20′28″N 78°46′38″E	Upload Photo
N-UP-L245	Temple site	Markhera		Lalitpur		Upload Photo
N-UP-L246	Temple of Neelkantha	Pali		Lalitpur	24°28′34″N 78°23′32″E	Temple of Neelkantha More images
N-UP-L247	Overhanging rock with some pre-historic sculptured bordering the Jamini Valley	Panduon		Lalitpur	24°16′15″N 78°39′09″E	Upload Photo
N-UP-L248	Remains of a large Vishnu temple	Satgato		Lalitpur	24°49′20″N 78°19′44″E	Upload Photo
N-UP-L249	Jain Temple and a Torana or Gateway	Sironi Khurd		Lalitpur		Upload Photo
N-UP-L250	Slab containing a Kutila inscription of 46 lines of the reign of Mahendrapaldeva in the compound of Santinatha's temple	Sironi Khurd		Lalitpur	24°49′29″N 78°19′30″E	Upload Photo
N-UP-L251	Torana or gateway situated outside the compound of modern Jain Temple	Sironi Khurd		Lalitpur	24°49′34″N 78°19′26″E	Upload Photo
N-UP-L252	Temple	Sonrai		Lalitpur		Upload Photo
N-UP-L253	Small temple with three figures of Vishnu in the niches outside	Surabad		Lalitpur		Upload Photo
N-UP-L254	Talbehat Fort	Talbehat		Lalitpur	25°02′20″N 78°26′09″E	Talbehat Fort More images
N-UP-L255	A beautiful temple of Mahadeva with the usual porch and shrine claboratoly carved.	Vijapur		Lalitpur	24°50′53″N 78°34′24″E	Upload Photo

== See also ==
- List of Monuments of National Importance in Agra district
- List of Monuments of National Importance in Agra circle
- List of Monuments of National Importance in Sarnath circle, Uttar Pradesh
- List of Monuments of National Importance in India for other Monuments of National Importance in India
- List of State Protected Monuments in Uttar Pradesh
