= List of Monuments of National Importance in Lucknow circle/North =

The ASI has recognized 366 Monuments of National Importance in Lucknow circle of Uttar Pradesh. For technical reasons, this list of ASI recognized monuments in the Lucknow circle has been split into three lists:

- List of Monuments of National Importance in Lalitpur district
- List of Monuments of National Importance in the Northern districts in Lucknow circle: Bahraich, Hardoi, Kanpur, Kanpur Dehat, Kheri, Lucknow, Rae Bareli, Sravasti Nagar, Sultanpur and Unnao (this list)
- List of Monuments of National Importance in the Southern districts in Lucknow circle: Allahabad, Banda, Chitrakut, Fatehpur, Hamirpur, Jalaun, Jhansi, Kaushambi and Mahoba

Monument N-UP-L16 of Ambedkar Nagar district, N-UP-L22 of Balrampur district, N-UP-L64 to N-UP-L69 of Ayodhya district, N-UP-L96 of Gonda District, N-UP-L351 of Siddharth Nagar district and N-UP-L363, N-UP-L365 of Sultanpur district have been shifted from ASI Lucknow circle to ASI Sarnath Circle as monument N-UP-S16, N-UP-S25, N-UP-S43 to N-UP-S48, N-UP-S62, N-UP-S121, N-UP-S123, N-UP-S124.

These monuments are listed at List of Monuments of National Importance in Sarnath circle, Uttar Pradesh

The Centre Government has delisted 18 monuments from the list of Protected Monuments as they were found to have ceased to be of national importance as per the provisions of Ancient Monuments and Archaeological Sites and Remains Act, 1958.

== List of monuments ==
SL. No.	Description	Location	Address	District	Coordinates	Image
N-UP-L17	Tomb of Salar Saifuddin alias Surkhru Salar	Bahraich		Bahraich	27°35′38″N 81°36′52″E	Tomb of Salar Saifuddin alias Surkhru Salar More images
N-UP-L18	Large brick strewn khera being the ruins of an apparently Buddhist city	Charda		Bahraich	27°57′04″N 81°35′35″E	Upload Photo
N-UP-L19	Khera said to be the ruins of one of the principal cities of Raja Karna of the Mahabharata	Hathi Kund		Bahraich		Upload Photo
N-UP-L20	Tomb of Rajab Sajar alias Hatila Salar	Shahpur Jote Yusuf		Bahraich	27°33′49″N 81°37′32″E	Upload Photo
N-UP-L21	Domes and buildings inside the inner enclosure including the ancient walls of the inner enclosure of Saiyid Salar Masud's celebrated dargah	Singha Parasi		Bahraich	27°35′38″N 81°36′52″E	Upload Photo
N-UP-L23	Mound locally known as Ora Jhar situated on the road from Balrampur near the ancient remains of Sahet-Mahet (Sravasti)	Ghooghulpur		Balrampur	27°30′01″N 82°03′08″E	Upload Photo
N-UP-L24	Mound locally known as Penahia Jhar situated on the road from Balrampur near the Ancient remains of Saheth-Maheth (Sravasti)	Ghooghulpur		Balrampur	27°30′09″N 82°03′15″E	Upload Photo
N-UP-L25	Mound locally known as Kharahua Jhar situated on the road from Balrampur near the Ancient remains of Saheth-Maheth (Sravasti)	Ghooghulpur		Balrampur	27°30′07″N 82°03′06″E	Upload Photo
N-UP-L100	Major Robert's Tomb	Baramau		Hardoi		Upload Photo
N-UP-L101	Brick mound locally called Bhankargarh	Gandwa		Hardoi	27°11′38″N 80°35′36″E	Upload Photo
N-UP-L102	High irregular khera covered with broken bricks and sculptures	Hardoi		Hardoi	27°23′17″N 80°06′55″E	Upload Photo
N-UP-L103	Mound known as Kalhaur or Killo	Kalhaur		Hardoi	27°28′09″N 80°07′26″E	Upload Photo
N-UP-L104	Memorial tomb	Khasaura		Hardoi	27°20′45″N 79°47′03″E	Upload Photo
N-UP-L105	Large dih covered with broken bricks and pottery crowned with a small ruined temple of the 19th century AD	Kherwa & Kajhgaon		Hardoi	27°03′59″N 80°12′12″E	Upload Photo
N-UP-L106	Memorial cemetery	Madhavganj		Hardoi	27°06′40″N 80°08′28″E	Upload Photo
N-UP-L107	Well near the Dargah of Makhdum Shah	Mallawan		Hardoi	27°02′53″N 80°08′49″E	Upload Photo
N-UP-L108	Large ruined site called Sandi Khera	Pali		Hardoi	27°19′58″N 80°09′27″E	Upload Photo
N-UP-L109	Tomb of Nawab of Sadar Johan	Pihani		Hardoi	27°37′18″N 80°12′09″E	Upload Photo
N-UP-L110	Ancient mound	Pahunchina Khera (Lakhamapur)		Hardoi	27°29′37″N 79°53′27″E	Upload Photo
N-UP-L111	Phulmati	Sandi		Hardoi	27°17′25″N 79°57′54″E	Upload Photo
N-UP-L112	Maqbara of Nawab Diler Khan	Shahabad		Hardoi	27°39′32″N 79°56′40″E	Maqbara of Nawab Diler Khan More images
N-UP-L144	Mound	Bithoor		Kanpur Nagar	26°37′07″N 80°16′20″E	Mound
N-UP-L145	Lona cross Garden	Kanpur		Kanpur Nagar	26°26′49″N 80°22′05″E	Upload Photo
N-UP-L146	Katcheri Cemetery	Kanpur		Kanpur Nagar	26°28′44″N 80°21′07″E	Katcheri Cemetery More images
N-UP-L147	"Nana Rao Park" Memorial well garden	Kanpur		Kanpur Nagar	26°28′18″N 80°21′40″E	"Nana Rao Park" Memorial well garden More images
N-UP-L148	Sawada Kothi, Monument including flight of steps with the surrounding pateau	Kanpur		Kanpur Nagar	26°26′08″N 80°21′39″E	Upload Photo
N-UP-L149	Subedar-ka-Talab Cemetery	Kanpur		Kanpur Nagar	26°28′35″N 80°19′59″E	Upload Photo
N-UP-L150	Wheeler's Entrechment	Kanpur		Kanpur Nagar	26°26′57″N 80°22′08″E	Upload Photo
N-UP-L151	Kos Minar	Khalaspur		Kanpur Dehat	26°13′39″N 79°47′00″E	Upload Photo
N-UP-L152	Three images of Lakshmana, Ganesh and Vishnu lying in the cells or each side of the doorway of the temple of Jagannatha and a Gupta pillar lying in the compound of the temple and other images	Behta		Kanpur Nagar	26°11′37″N 80°14′49″E	Three images of Lakshmana, Ganesh and Vishnu lying in the cells or each side of the doorway of the temple of Jagannatha and a Gupta pillar lying in the compound of the temple and other images More images
N-UP-L153	Ancient brick temple	Bhitargaon		Kanpur Nagar	26°12′35″N 80°16′32″E	Ancient brick temple More images
N-UP-L154	Mound of ruins covered with large bricks and broken figures	Bhitargaon		Kanpur Nagar	26°12′31″N 80°16′30″E	Upload Photo
N-UP-L155	Kos Minar	Bhognipur		Kanpur Dehat	26°12′14″N 79°48′27″E	Upload Photo
N-UP-L156	Kos Minar	Bhognipur		Kanpur Dehat		Upload Photo
N-UP-L157	Tank near the tomb of Sandal Shah	Bichhiapur		Kanpur Dehat	26°25′15″N 79°40′27″E	Upload Photo
N-UP-L158	Temple known as Phulmati Devi	Bihupur		Kanpur Nagar	26°08′45″N 80°16′20″E	Upload Photo
N-UP-L159	Kos Minar	Chaparghata		Kanpur Dehat	26°10′11″N 79°55′26″E	Upload Photo
N-UP-L160	Kos Minar	Deosar		Kanpur Dehat		Upload Photo
N-UP-L161	Fragment of a pillar	Dumapur		Kanpur Dehat	26°42′42″N 79°50′29″E	Upload Photo
N-UP-L162	Kos Minar	Gour		Kanpur Dehat	26°11′40″N 79°51′00″E	Upload Photo
N-UP-L163	Kos Minar	Gour		Kanpur Dehat	26°11′41″N 79°51′00″E	Upload Photo
N-UP-L164	Kos Minar	Halia		Kanpur Dehat		Upload Photo
N-UP-L165	Kos Minar	Jallapur Sikandara		Kanpur Dehat	26°17′06″N 79°42′35″E	Upload Photo
N-UP-L166	Ancient brick temple	Karchulipur		Kanpur Nagar	26°10′56″N 80°21′26″E	Upload Photo
N-UP-L167	Two ancient brick temple	Koratha		Kanpur Nagar	26°13′19″N 80°18′55″E	Upload Photo
N-UP-L168	Mound and the ancient pillar in a modern domed chamber together with the stone cock lying in the front of it	Indalpur Lalu		Kanpur Dehat	26°43′27″N 79°50′38″E	Upload Photo
N-UP-L169	Kos Minar	Pailwaru		Kanpur Dehat		Upload Photo
N-UP-L170	Temple known as 'Mahadeo Baba'	Parauli		Kanpur Nagar	26°14′51″N 80°15′41″E	Upload Photo
N-UP-L171	Kos Minar	Pitampur		Kanpur Dehat	26°23′38″N 79°35′56″E	Upload Photo
N-UP-L172	Kos Minar	Raigawa		Kanpur Dehat	26°12′35″N 79°48′01″E	Upload Photo
N-UP-L173	Kos Minar	Rajpur		Kanpur Dehat	26°18′41″N 79°40′38″E	Upload Photo
N-UP-L174	Kos Minar	Sakhin Buzurg		Kanpur Dehat	26°22′39″N 79°37′06″E	Upload Photo
N-UP-L175	Kos Minar	Sardarpur		Kanpur Dehat	26°20′55″N 79°38′42″E	Upload Photo
N-UP-L176	Sanskrit inscription in the well of Gayadin Sukal	Subhanpur		Kanpur Nagar	26°50′05″N 80°04′08″E	Upload Photo
N-UP-L177	Brick temple at Nibiyakheda	Bhadwara		Kanpur Nagar	26°06′31″N 80°16′15″E	Upload Photo
N-UP-L182	British Monuments	Aurangabad		Lakhimpur Kheri	27°47′06″N 80°20′03″E	Upload Photo
N-UP-L256	Mounds covered with bricks	Arjunpur and Rukhara		Lucknow	27°02′28″N 80°54′45″E	Upload Photo
N-UP-L257	Cemetery	Bargawan		Lucknow	26°47′39″N 80°53′56″E	Upload Photo
N-UP-L258	Cemeteries (Delisted)	Jahraila Road		Lucknow		Upload Photo
N-UP-L259	Amjad Ali Shah's Mausoleum	Hazratganj		Lucknow	26°50′57″N 80°56′23″E	Amjad Ali Shah's Mausoleum
N-UP-L260	Bibiapur House	Cantonment		Lucknow	26°49′20″N 80°58′55″E	Upload Photo
N-UP-L261	British Cemetery at Chiria jhil	Sapru Marg		Lucknow	26°51′14″N 80°56′48″E	Upload Photo
N-UP-L262	Buildings, north-west of Dilkusha Palace	Cantonment		Lucknow		Upload Photo
N-UP-L263	Cemetery at Alambagh	Lucknow		Lucknow	26°48′49″N 80°54′19″E	Upload Photo
N-UP-L264	Cemetery at Dilkusha	Lucknow		Lucknow	26°49′42″N 80°57′54″E	Cemetery at Dilkusha More images
N-UP-L265	Cemetery at Gaughat (Delisted)	Lucknow		Lucknow		Upload Photo
N-UP-L266	Cemetery near Kaisar Pasand	Lucknow		Lucknow	26°51′07″N 80°55′43″E	Upload Photo
N-UP-L267	Cemetery near Fort Machi Bhawan	Lucknow		Lucknow	26°52′17″N 80°54′36″E	Upload Photo
N-UP-L268	Cemetery in Raja Incha Singh's compound	Lucknow		Lucknow	26°51′27″N 80°56′18″E	Upload Photo
N-UP-L269	Cemetery on La-Martiniere Road	Lucknow		Lucknow		Cemetery on La-Martiniere Road
N-UP-L270	Cemetery at Vilayat Bagh	Lucknow		Lucknow	26°49′47″N 80°58′14″E	Upload Photo
N-UP-L271	Dargah Hazrat Abbas	Lucknow		Lucknow	26°51′39″N 80°53′39″E	Dargah Hazrat Abbas More images
N-UP-L272	Dianut-ud-daula's Karbala	Lucknow		Lucknow	26°51′18″N 80°53′36″E	Dianut-ud-daula's Karbala More images
N-UP-L273	General wali Kothi	Lucknow		Lucknow	26°51′35″N 80°55′52″E	General wali Kothi More images
N-UP-L274	Ibrahim Chisti's Tomb	Lucknow		Lucknow	26°51′16″N 80°54′41″E	Ibrahim Chisti's Tomb More images
N-UP-L275	Imambara Amin-ud-daula	Lucknow		Lucknow		Upload Photo
N-UP-L276	Imambara of Asaf-ud-daula	Lucknow		Lucknow	26°52′09″N 80°54′46″E	Imambara of Asaf-ud-daula More images
N-UP-L277	Jama Masjid near Hussainabad	Lucknow		Lucknow	26°52′21″N 80°54′04″E	Jama Masjid near Hussainabad More images
N-UP-L278	Kaiser Bagh Gates	Lucknow		Lucknow	26°51′11″N 80°55′51″E	Kaiser Bagh Gates More images
N-UP-L279	Kalan-ki-Lat at adjoining cemetery in Faquir Mohammad Khan ka Hata	Lucknow		Lucknow	26°51′02″N 80°55′25″E	Upload Photo
N-UP-L280	Karbala of Tal Katora	Lucknow		Lucknow	26°50′06″N 80°53′22″E	Karbala of Tal Katora More images
N-UP-L281	Kaz-Main Buildings	Lucknow		Lucknow	26°51′19″N 80°53′45″E	Kaz-Main Buildings More images
N-UP-L282	Mulka Jahan's Karbala	Lucknow		Lucknow	26°50′38″N 80°54′37″E	Mulka Jahan's Karbala More images
N-UP-L283	Masjid connected with Asaf-ud-daula (also: Asfi Mosque)	Lucknow		Lucknow	26°52′10″N 80°54′44″E	Masjid connected with Asaf-ud-daula (also: Asfi Mosque) More images
N-UP-L284	Monuments of Ninety-third Highlanders	Lucknow		Lucknow	26°51′20″N 80°57′09″E	Upload Photo
N-UP-L285	Nadan Mahal	Lucknow		Lucknow	26°51′16″N 80°54′39″E	Nadan Mahal More images
N-UP-L286	Nasir-ud-din Haider's Karbala in Daliganj	Lucknow		Lucknow	26°52′32″N 80°55′34″E	Nasir-ud-din Haider's Karbala in Daliganj More images
N-UP-L287	Neil's Gate	Lucknow		Lucknow	26°51′22″N 80°55′59″E	Neil's Gate
N-UP-L288	Old Palace at Dilkusha	Lucknow		Lucknow	26°49′43″N 80°57′55″E	Old Palace at Dilkusha More images
N-UP-L289	Picture Gallery Hussainabad Baradari	Lucknow		Lucknow	26°52′30″N 80°54′27″E	Picture Gallery Hussainabad Baradari More images
N-UP-L290	Residency Buildings	Lucknow		Lucknow	26°51′38″N 80°55′36″E	Residency Buildings More images
N-UP-L291	Rumi Darwaza	Lucknow		Lucknow	26°51′38″N 80°54′57″E	Rumi Darwaza
N-UP-L292	Sapper's Tomb	Lucknow		Lucknow	26°51′14″N 80°56′04″E	Sapper's Tomb
N-UP-L293	Sikander Bagh Building	Lucknow		Lucknow	26°51′19″N 80°57′08″E	Sikander Bagh Building More images
N-UP-L294	Sikchawali Kothi	Lucknow		Lucknow	26°51′32″N 80°55′42″E	Upload Photo
N-UP-L295	Tahsin Ali's Mosque	Lucknow		Lucknow	26°51′40″N 80°54′23″E	Upload Photo
N-UP-L296	Tomb of Gazi-ud-din Haider	Lucknow		Lucknow	26°51′30″N 80°56′46″E	Tomb of Gazi-ud-din Haider More images
N-UP-L297	Tomb of Janab Aliya	Lucknow		Lucknow	26°51′12″N 80°55′26″E	Tomb of Janab Aliya More images
N-UP-L298	Tomb known as Char Khamba	Lucknow		Lucknow	26°51′15″N 80°54′37″E	Upload Photo
N-UP-L299	Tomb at Lotan Bagh	Lucknow		Lucknow	26°52′45″N 80°51′57″E	Upload Photo
N-UP-L300	Tomb of Mohammad Ali Shah (also: Chhota Imambara)	Lucknow		Lucknow	26°52′23″N 80°54′15″E	Tomb of Mohammad Ali Shah (also: Chhota Imambara) More images
N-UP-L301	Tomb at Musabagh	Lucknow		Lucknow	26°53′23″N 80°52′25″E	Tomb at Musabagh
N-UP-L302	Tomb of Mushir Zadi, wife of Saadat Ali Khan	Lucknow		Lucknow	26°51′15″N 80°56′04″E	Tomb of Mushir Zadi, wife of Saadat Ali Khan More images
N-UP-L303	Tomb of Saadat Ali Khan	Lucknow		Lucknow	26°51′16″N 80°56′01″E	Tomb of Saadat Ali Khan More images
N-UP-L304	Two Cemeteries	Lucknow		Lucknow		Upload Photo
N-UP-L305	Victoria Memorial	Lucknow		Lucknow	26°51′23″N 80°56′03″E	Victoria Memorial More images
N-UP-L306	Three Tombs (Delisted)	Lucknow Faizabad Road at miles 3 and 5		Lucknow		Upload Photo
N-UP-L307	Two Cemeteries	Lucknow Faizabad Road at mile 4		Lucknow		Upload Photo
N-UP-L308	Cemeteries	Lucknow-Kanpur Road at mile 13		Lucknow		Upload Photo
N-UP-L309	Cemetery	Lucknow - Rae Barelli Road at mile 6		Lucknow		Upload Photo
N-UP-L310	Cemetery	Marion		Lucknow	26°54′11″N 80°56′58″E	Cemetery More images
N-UP-L311	Memorial pillar marking the site of the pre-Mutiny Residency in the old Mariaon Cantonment	Mahibullapur		Lucknow		Upload Photo
N-UP-L312	Mound	Nagarm		Lucknow		Upload Photo
N-UP-L313	Mound	Paharnagar		Lucknow		Upload Photo
N-UP-L314	Mound	Takuria		Lucknow		Upload Photo
N-UP-L315	Bridge over the Beta river and temple attached to it	Tikait Ganj		Lucknow	26°52′59″N 80°46′27″E	Bridge over the Beta river and temple attached to it More images
N-UP-L346	Fort Gate	Rae Bareli		Rae Bareli	26°14′00″N 81°13′40″E	Upload Photo
N-UP-L347	Sai Bridge	Rae Bareli –Pratapgarh road		Rae Bareli	26°12′06″N 81°14′50″E	Upload Photo
N-UP-L348	Siva Temple	Rajmau		Rae Bareli	26°26′15″N 81°02′30″E	Upload Photo
N-UP-L349	Site and stupa and monastery of the Sakyas	Piprahwa		Siddharth Nagar	27°26′52″N 83°07′45″E	Site and stupa and monastery of the Sakyas More images
N-UP-L350	Ancient Site	Pipri		Siddharth Nagar	27°19′49″N 83°06′20″E	Upload Photo
N-UP-L352	Ancient Site	Tola Ganwaria in Birdpur frontier road		Siddharth Nagar	27°26′53″N 83°07′37″E	Ancient Site
N-UP-L353	Ancient Site	Tola Salrgarh south-west of Siswa Tal near Nepal - India border		Siddharth Nagar	27°26′54″N 83°08′15″E	Ancient Site
N-UP-L354	Ancient Site	VillageBirdpur No.1, Tola Thankurpur (on the west of Salya stupa)		Siddharth Nagar	27°26′30″N 83°07′16″E	Upload Photo
N-UP-L355	The site of Sahet Mahet measuring 286.026 acres in the Bahraich district (now Sravasti Nagar district) and 123.93 acres in the Gonda district (now Balrampur district)	Sahet-Mahet		Sravasti	27°30′31″N 82°02′22″E	Upload Photo
N-UP-L356	Ancient site near the village of Bhitti	Bhitti		Sravasti	27°31′15″N 82°00′03″E	Upload Photo
N-UP-L357	Mound known as Kutti Behari Das	Ikauna (Chakra) Bhandar (Sahet Mahet)		Sravasti		Upload Photo
N-UP-L358	Mound known as Kutti Satruhan Das	Ikauna (Chakra) Bhandar (Sahet Mahet)		Sravasti		Upload Photo
N-UP-L359	Mound known as Bani Nath Mahadeo	Ikauna (Chakra) Bhandar (Sahet Mahet)		Sravasti		Upload Photo
N-UP-L360	Mound of brick ruins	Tandwa		Sravasti	27°31′39″N 81°54′28″E	Upload Photo
N-UP-L361	Small round shaped mound	Tandwa		Sravasti		Upload Photo
N-UP-L362	Group of ruined brick temple of the 10th century locally called Teligarhi	Bhagupur		Sultanpur		Upload Photo
N-UP-L364	Extensive brick strewn mounds undoubtedly of the ruins of Buddhist cities	Raipur, Tikri, Shahgarh		Sultanpur		Upload Photo
N-UP-L366	Tomb of Qurban Mohammad	Banger Mau		Unnao	26°53′26″N 80°12′30″E	Upload Photo

== See also ==
- List of Monuments of National Importance in Agra district
- List of Monuments of National Importance in Agra circle
- List of Monuments of National Importance in India for other Monuments of National Importance in India
- List of State Protected Monuments in Uttar Pradesh
