= Pilkhana, Uttar Pradesh =

Pilkhana Pilakhna
- Nagar Panchayat
- Location in Uttar Pradesh, India Pilkhana (India)
- Coordinates: 27°51′N 78°16′E
- Country: India
- State: Uttar Pradesh
- District: Aligarh
- Established: 15th century

Population (2011)
  - Total: 11,518

Languages
  - Official: Hindi
- Time zone: UTC+5:30 (IST)
- Vehicle registration: UP
- Website: up.gov.in

Pilkhana also named as Pilakhna, is a village and a nagar panchayat in Aligarh district in the Indian state of Uttar Pradesh.

== Demographics ==
As of the 2001 Census of India, Pilkhana had a population of 9692. Males constitute 53% of the population and females 47%. Pilkhana has an average literacy rate of 28%, lower than the national average of 59.5%: male literacy is 37%, and female literacy is 17%. In Pilkhana, 22% of the population is under 6 years of age.
