= Mandawar, Uttar Pradesh =

Mandawar
- Urban
- Location in Uttar Pradesh, India
- Coordinates: 29.486°N 78.126°E
- Country: India
- State: Uttar Pradesh
- District: Bijnor
- Elevation: 223 m (732 ft)

Population (2011)
  - Total: 21,078

Languages
  - Official: Hindi
- Time zone: UTC+5:30 (IST)
- PIN: 246721
- Telephone code: 01342
- Vehicle registration: UP-20

Mandawar is a town and a nagar panchayat city in Bijnor district in the Indian state of Uttar Pradesh. It is a green area near the Ganges. Most residents are farmers. The area was known for rose cultivation in the past but in recent decades farmers have switched to sugar cane production because of government incentives. There are also a lot of mango orchards around Mandawar. People engage in cultivation and harvest of mangoes during the summer months.

== Demographics ==
As of 2011 India census, Mandawar had a population of 21,078 of which 11,119 are males and 9,959 females. Mandawar has an average literacy rate of 61.22%, lower than the state average of 67.68%: male literacy is 65.62%, and female literacy is 56.38%. Children age 0-6 make up 3,020, 14.33 % of the total. The female sex ratio is 896, compared to the state average of 912. The child sex ratio is around 826, compared to the Uttar Pradesh state average of 902.

== Governance ==
Mandawar Nagar Panchayat hosts over 3,486 houses. It is authorized to build roads in the panchayat and impose taxes on properties in its jurisdiction.

== Education ==
St. Paul's High School was established in 1992 by the Education Society of the Catholic Diocese of Bijnor. A Hindi medium high school, enrolling 1500 students from the town and nearby villages. It used to be a leading institution of the town but its prestige has been gradually taken over by other English medium school. The school continues to be popular among people of low income group who can't afford send their children to high fees demanding English medium schools.

Mahatama Gandhi Inter College is the largest and oldest inter college in the town. It was established around 1957 by Pandit Keshav Sharan Sharma. Most of the children of the villages around Mandawar enroll there. Most of the time there was no fee for students in early period.

Adarsh Vidya Niketan Shahabazpur was established around 1980. Located in Kelawala (the four-way intersection where the roads to the villages Shahabazpur and Mohandiya meet), 1 km from Mandawar, it became an inter college about 2003 through the work of Surendra Vishnoi and Mahashay Natthu Singh, who was the founding principal and manager. A number of students study there too.

Adarsh Vidya Niketan (junior) school is located in Kelawala (Sahabazpur) along with the senior school which is managed by Sanjeev Kumar.

Shining Star Public High School was established in 1987. It provides education till middle school.

Modern Era Public School is located in Chandok Mandawar road. An English Medium school, it has slowly turned out to be the most popular school in the town specially people of middle income and high income groups.It was established in 2009.

Prakash Public School on dayalwala road is another popular institution for English Medium Education.

Prema Satyaveera Girls Inter College is available for girls only. It is a private institution that provides high school and senior secondary school education.

The nearest degree college, Mandawar Degree College sits on Mandawar Chandok road. It is established recently and provides a vast number of degrees such as BA, Bsc etc. It is becoming widely popular due to the proximity and the ease of transportation that comes with it.

Many schools offer primary education. They are generally run on a small scales by families who employ graduates and sometimes even senior secondary school passed individuals as teachers.
