= List of State Protected Monuments in Uttar Pradesh =

This is a list of State Protected Monuments as officially reported by and available through the website of the Archaeological Survey of India in the Indian state Uttar Pradesh. The monument identifier is a combination of the abbreviation of the subdivision of the list (state, ASI circle) and the numbering as published on the website of the ASI. State Protected Monuments have been recognized by the ASI in Uttar Pradesh. Besides the State Protected Monuments, also the Monuments of National Importance in this state might be relevant.

== List of State Protected Monuments ==
SL. No.	Description	Location	Address	District	Coordinates	Image
S-UP-1	Bateshwar nath Temple	Agra				Bateshwar nath Temple
S-UP-2	Mohari ancient Tomb	Agra				Upload Photo
S-UP-3	Tila Jaigara	Agra				Upload Photo
S-UP-4	Tehsil Bhavan, Kiravali (Also known as Akbar's hunting outpost)	Agra				Upload Photo
S-UP-143	Akbar's Tomb	Agra				Akbar's Tomb
S-UP-5	Fort of Aligarh and its boundary	Aligarh				Fort of Aligarh and its boundary
S-UP-6	Ancient mound at Koldihwa	Allahabad				Upload Photo
S-UP-7	Ancient mound at Mahagara	Allahabad				Upload Photo
S-UP-8	Ancient mound at Chopani Mando	Allahabad				Upload Photo
S-UP-9	Kanvashram	Bijnaur				Upload Photo
S-UP-10	Purana Mandir	Chandauli				Upload Photo
S-UP-11	Haveli Avadh	Faizabad				Upload Photo
S-UP-12	Guptarghat Temple	Faizabad				Upload Photo
S-UP-13	Tomb of Firos Shah	Firozabad				Upload Photo
S-UP-14	Rupaidih	Gonda				Upload Photo
S-UP-15	Baradari Vazirganj	Gonda				Upload Photo
S-UP-16	Vishnu Image	Gorakhpur				Upload Photo
S-UP-17	Chadihar	Gorakhpur				Upload Photo
S-UP-18	Narhan	Gorakhpur				Upload Photo
S-UP-19	Mound at Shahabad	Hardoi				Upload Photo
S-UP-20	Ancient mound at Gegalapur	Hardoi				Upload Photo
S-UP-21	Narpat Singh ki Gadhi	Hardoi				Narpat Singh ki Gadhi
S-UP-22	Mausoleum of Sher Jaman Khan	Jaunpur				Mausoleum of Sher Jaman Khan
S-UP-23	Patthar ka Sher	Jaunpur				Patthar ka Sher
S-UP-24	Bridge at River Sai	Jaunpur				Upload Photo
S-UP-25	Shahi Pul or Royal Bridge	Jaunpur				Shahi Pul or Royal Bridge
S-UP-26	Rani Lakshmibai Temple	Jhansi				Rani Lakshmibai Temple
S-UP-27	Barua Sagar Fort	Jhansi				Upload Photo
S-UP-28	Ground in front of Phuta Darwaza	Jhansi				Upload Photo
S-UP-29	Ground in front of Rani Mahal	Jhansi				Ground in front of Rani Mahal
S-UP-30	Hathikhana and Raghunath Rao's Mahal	Jhansi				Upload Photo
S-UP-31	Ancient mound at Jajmau	Kanpur				Ancient mound at Jajmau
S-UP-32	Shiva Temple at Tikaitrai	Kanpur				Upload Photo
S-UP-33	Baradari built by Raja Tikaitrai	Kanpur				Upload Photo
S-UP-34	Balmiki Ashram	Kanpur				Upload Photo
S-UP-35	Math of Pisnarin	Kanpur Dehat				Upload Photo
S-UP-36	Ancient mound at Musanagar on the bank of Yamuna	Kanpur Dehat				Upload Photo
S-UP-37	Jahangirabad Tila	Kanpur Dehat				Upload Photo
S-UP-38	Shukla Talab	Kanpur Dehat				Shukla Talab
S-UP-39	Ancient mound connected with Nana Fadnavis	Kanpur				Upload Photo
S-UP-40	Medhak Shiva Temple	Lakhimpur				Medhak Shiva Temple
S-UP-41	Navgrah Temple	Lalitpur				Upload Photo
S-UP-42	Digambar Jain Temple	Lalitpur				Upload Photo
S-UP-43	Siva Temple	Lalitpur				Upload Photo
S-UP-44	Ram Janki Temple	Lalitpur				Upload Photo
S-UP-45	Jain Temple	Lalitpur				Upload Photo
S-UP-46	Remains of Temple	Lalitpur				Upload Photo
S-UP-47	Laxmangarh Temple	Lalitpur				Upload Photo
S-UP-48	Ancient Temple at Sumergarh	Lalitpur				Upload Photo
S-UP-49	Ancient Temple	Lalitpur				Upload Photo
S-UP-50	Ranchod Temple	Lalitpur				Upload Photo
S-UP-51	Balabehat fort	Lalitpur				Upload Photo
S-UP-52	Hatvara Temple	Lalitpur				Upload Photo
S-UP-53	Temple and tank	Lalitpur				Upload Photo
S-UP-54	Baoli	Lalitpur				Upload Photo
S-UP-55	Ram Temple	Lalitpur				Upload Photo
S-UP-56	Ancient Temple (mud)	Lalitpur				Upload Photo
S-UP-57	Ancient Temple (mud)	Lalitpur				Upload Photo
S-UP-58	Sorai fort	Lalitpur				Upload Photo
S-UP-59	Two Gond Temples	Lalitpur				Upload Photo
S-UP-60	Siva Temple	Lalitpur				Upload Photo
S-UP-61	Ancient Temple	Lalitpur				Upload Photo
S-UP-62	Ancient tomb	Lalitpur				Upload Photo
S-UP-63	Two Gond Temples	Lalitpur				Upload Photo
S-UP-64	Ancient Bhaitak	Lalitpur				Upload Photo
S-UP-65	Ancient Durga Temple	Lalitpur				Upload Photo
S-UP-66	Raghavendar Sarkar Temple (Ancient Siva Temple)	Lalitpur				Upload Photo
S-UP-67	Alambagh bhavan and Gate	Lucknow				Upload Photo
S-UP-68	Lal Baradari	Lucknow				Lal Baradari
S-UP-69	Bari Chhatri Manzil	Lucknow				Bari Chhatri Manzil
S-UP-70	Farhat Baksh Kothi (next to Bari Chhatri Manzil (Umbrella Palace)	Lucknow				Farhat Baksh Kothi (next to Bari Chhatri Manzil (Umbrella Palace)
S-UP-71	Roshan-ud-Daulah Kothi	Lucknow				Roshan-ud-Daulah Kothi
S-UP-72	Hulaskheda Fort	Lucknow				Upload Photo
S-UP-73	Dahiar ka Tila	Lucknow				Upload Photo
S-UP-74	Dadupur ka Tila	Lucknow				Upload Photo
S-UP-75	Natwadih	Lucknow				Upload Photo
S-UP-76	Chaturbhurj Baba Deva Sthan	Lucknow				Upload Photo
S-UP-77	Mandak Maharani Devasthana	Lucknow				Upload Photo
S-UP-78	Devra Thakur Devasthana	Lucknow				Upload Photo
S-UP-79	Janaki Charan Baba (Dhopi Maharani Devastana)	Lucknow				Upload Photo
S-UP-80	Ruins of Kacheri of Raja Udai Singh	Mahamaya Nagar				Upload Photo
S-UP-81	Fort of Sasni	Mahamaya Nagar				Upload Photo
S-UP-82	Banarsia Fort and Khurd	Maharajganj				Upload Photo
S-UP-83	Shantinath Temple	Mahoba				Upload Photo
S-UP-84	Yoginimata Temple	Mahoba				Upload Photo
S-UP-85	Supa- Gadhi	Mahoba				Upload Photo
S-UP-86	Dyudhi Darwaza	Mahoba				Upload Photo
S-UP-87	Ancient Temple (Madh)	Mahoba				Upload Photo
S-UP-88	Gopinath Temple	Mathura		Mathura		Upload Photo
S-UP-89	Ancient mound of Sonkh	Mathura		Mathura		Ancient mound of Sonkh
S-UP-90	Mound at Govindnagar	Mathura		Mathura		Upload Photo
S-UP-91	Kas Fort (Kans Quila)	Mathura		Mathura		Kas Fort (Kans Quila) More images
S-UP-92	Potra Kund	Mathura		Mathura		Potra Kund
S-UP-93	Kusumvan sarovar and Chhatris			Mathura		Kusumvan sarovar and Chhatris More images
S-UP-94	Chhatris of Barsana	Mathura		Mathura		Chhatris of Barsana
S-UP-95	Chhatris of Govardhan	Govardhan		Mathura		Chhatris of Govardhan More images
S-UP-96	Samadhi of Ras Khan	Mahaban		Mathura		Samadhi of Ras Khan More images
S-UP-97	Bharadih	Mau				Upload Photo
S-UP-98	Baleshwarnath Temple	Meerut				Upload Photo
S-UP-99	Begam Samru Mahal	Meerut				Upload Photo
S-UP-100	Chunar first	Mirzapur				Upload Photo
S-UP-101	Ancient site of Bhuili	Mirzapur				Upload Photo
S-UP-102	Sarnath Temple	Mirzapur				Upload Photo
S-UP-103	Siddhanath ki Dari	Mirzapur				Upload Photo
S-UP-104	Lekhnia Pahar	Mirzapur				Lekhnia Pahar
S-UP-105	Painted rock- shelter	Mirzapur				Upload Photo
S-UP-106	Megalithic Remains	Mirzapur				Upload Photo
S-UP-107	Painted rockshelter at Lekhnia Pahar	Mirzapur				Upload Photo
S-UP-108	Megalithic remains of Kotwar Pahar	Mirzapur				Upload Photo
S-UP-109	Bhaldria Painted rockshelter	Mirzapur				Upload Photo
S-UP-110	Lekhnia Painted Rockshelter	Mirzapur				Upload Photo
S-UP-111	Mausoleum of Baba Garibnath	Muzaffarnagar				Upload Photo
S-UP-112	Purana Makbara, Bantikheda	Muzaffarnagar				Upload Photo
S-UP-113	Gauri Shankar Temple (Memorial)	Pilibhit				Upload Photo
S-UP-114	Sarai Nahar Rai (Ancient site)	Pratapgarh				Upload Photo
S-UP-115	Mahadaha (Ancient site)	Pratapgarh				Upload Photo
S-UP-116	Oydih (Mound at Oy)	Rae Bareli				Upload Photo
S-UP-117	Mound and Sahaspal ka Kila	Saharanpur				Upload Photo
S-UP-118	Samadhi and Mausoleum od Sant Kabirdas	Sant Kabir Nagar				Samadhi and Mausoleum od Sant Kabirdas
S-UP-119	Ancient of Kopia or Anupia	Sant Kabir Nagar				Upload Photo
S-UP-120	Manvadih Mound	Sitapur				Upload Photo
S-UP-121	Hussainiadih	Sitapur				Upload Photo
S-UP-122	Kot Tila	Sitapur				Upload Photo
S-UP-123	Masan Devi Temple and Mound	Sitapur				Upload Photo
S-UP-124	Gadhi	Sitapur				Upload Photo
S-UP-125	Kalpa Devi and Aastik Baba Temple and Mound	Sitapur				Upload Photo
S-UP-126	Rockshelters	Sonbhadra				Upload Photo
S-UP-127	Pancmukhi and Painted rockshekters	Sonbhadra				Pancmukhi and Painted rockshekters
S-UP-128	Mukhadri and Painted rockshelters	Sonbhadra				Upload Photo
S-UP-129	Shiva Tample	Sonbhadra				Upload Photo
S-UP-130	Itihawa	Sultanpur				Upload Photo
S-UP-131	Thakurbaba Temple	Sultanpur				Upload Photo
S-UP-132	Mahabiran	Sultanpur				Upload Photo
S-UP-133	Mound and Temple	Sultanpur				Upload Photo
S-UP-134	Hasanpir tila(Hanuman Gadhi	Unnao				Upload Photo
S-UP-135	Sachan kot ka Tila	Unnao				Upload Photo
S-UP-136	Ancient mound at Ugu	Unnao				Upload Photo
S-UP-137	Battis Khamba	Varanasi				Upload Photo
S-UP-138	Battis Khamba	Varanasi				Upload Photo
S-UP-139	Lahartara Talab	Varanasi				Upload Photo
S-UP-140	Kardmeshwar Mahadeva Mandir	Varanasi				Kardmeshwar Mahadeva Mandir
S-UP-141	Guradham Mandir	Varanasi				Guradham Mandir

== See also ==
- List of State Protected Monuments in India for other State Protected Monuments in India
- List of Monuments of National Importance in Uttar Pradesh
