= Shiva Bhagwati Temple Akingam =

Shiva Bhagwati Temple
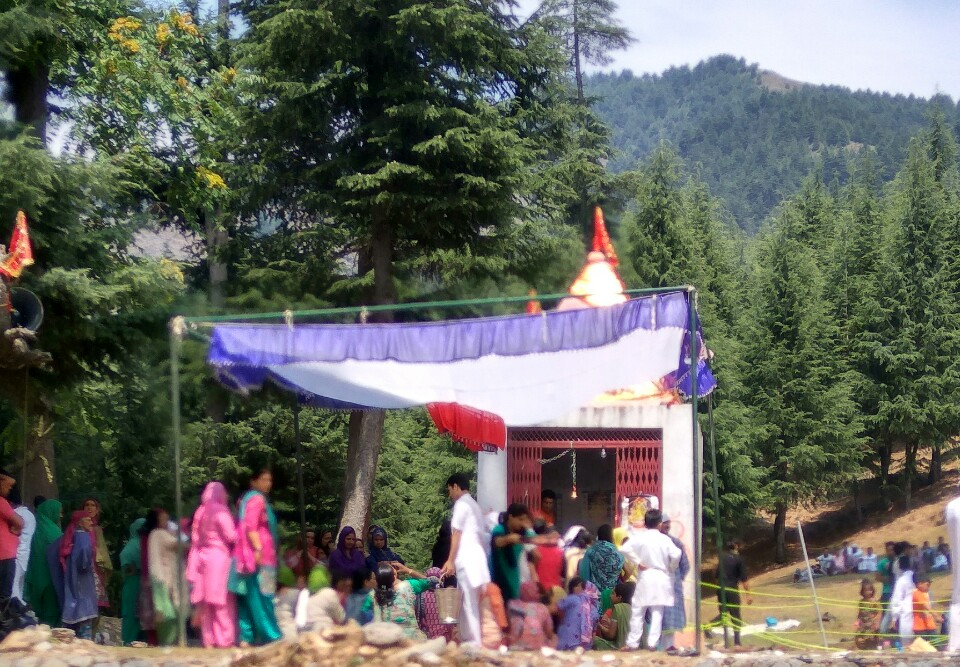

- Location within Jammu and Kashmir

Religion
- Affiliation: Hinduism

Location
- Location: Akingam, Anantnag, Jammu and Kashmir, India
- Coordinates: 33.70°N 75.33°E

Shiva Bhagwati Temple Akingam is a temple of Jagad Amba Shiva Bhagwati in Kashmir valley

== See also ==
- Achabal
- Kumar Mohalla Akingam
