= Hadipora =

Village in sopore Baramulla, Jammu and Kashmir, India

Hadipora or Heaidpur Sopore is a village in Sopore, Baramulla district, Jammu and Kashmir. It is 7 km (4.3 mi) away from Main Chowk Sopore. The village is known as the 'Heart of Sopore,' as it is surrounded by the main villages of Sopor like Achabal, Paraypora, Rebban, Nowpora, and Doabgah. This village is accessible by the National Highway which connects it to Handwara, Kupwara and other northern regions of Kashmir.

== Education ==
This village has two Middle Schools, one Higher Secondary School and a Govt Degree College. Govt Degree College Hadipora (sopore), a newly established college, near baramulla handwara national highway that leads to Kupwara and northern regions of Kashmir.

== Religion ==
All the people of this village are Muslims. This village has two Jamia Masjids and other nine mosques.

== Playground ==
Hadipora has a playground used for cricket and football, which includes two large Chinars trees.

== Healthcare ==
This village has one Govt Hospital which fails to provide even basic health facilities to the inhabitants of this village.
