= Larkipora =

Larkipora/Luckbawan Larkipora Larkipur or Leadakpur
- Town
- Country: India
- State: Jammu and Kashmir
- District: Anantnag

Languages
  - Official: Kashmiri, Urdu, Hindi, Dogri, English
- Time zone: UTC+5:30 (IST)
- PIN: 192211
- Vehicle registration: JK03

Larkipora, also known as Larkipur/Leadakpur, is a model town and a notified area committee in the Anantnag district of the Indian union territory of Jammu and Kashmir and is the business hub of adjacent villages Lukbawan Kuchipora, Fatehpora, Shepora, Gund Fatehpora, Dooru, Hakura, Khushipora, Sadoora Nageenpora, Zaldora, Dehruna, Shakerpora, Dialgam among others.
