= Akingam =

Village in Jammu and Kashmir, India

- Location in Jammu and Kashmir, India Akingam (India)
- Coordinates: 33.70°N 75.33°E
- Country: India
- Union territory: Jammu and Kashmir
- Division: Kashmir
- District: Anantnag
- Elevation: 1,950 m (6,400 ft)

Population (2011)
  - Total: 5,007

Languages
  - Official: Kashmiri, Dogri, Urdu, Hindi, English
- Time zone: UTC+5:30 (IST)
- Postal code: 192201
- Vehicle registration: JK03
- Website: www.anantnag.nic.in

Akingam is a village in South Kashmir in the Anantnag district, in the Indian union territory of Jammu and Kashmir. It is at a distance of approximately 14.2 kilometres (8.8 mi) from the Lal Chowk along a route passing through the tourist resorts of Achabal and Kokernag. In revenue records, the village of Akingam is still called Maqan Shiva Bhagwati. The adjacent villages are Mohripura, Hiller, Badasgam, Hardpora and Badoora.

A view of Zoon mall (mountain) from Akingam village

== Demographics ==
As of the 2011 Census of India, there were 5,007 people, 2,026 workers and 755 families residing in Akingam. There were 2,579 males and 2,428 females. 17.93% of Akingam's total population, 898 people, were children aged 0–6.

The average sex ratio of Akingam was 941 females to 1,000 males, higher than the average of Jammu and Kashmir which was 889:1000. The child sex ratio of Akingam was lower than Jammu and Kashmir's average at 848:1000 to 862:1000.

In 2011, the literacy rate of Akingam was 67.41% whereas the literacy rate of Jammu and Kashmir was 67.16%. Akingam's male literacy rate was 76.40% while the female literacy rate was 58.09%.

particulars	total	male	female
total no. of houses	755	-	-
population	5007	2759	2428
child(0-6)	898	486	412
schedule caste	0	0	0
schedule tribe	339	184	155
literacy	67.41 %	76.40 %	58.09 %
total workers	2026	1276	750
main worker	944	-	-
marginal worker	1082	468	614

== See also ==
- Fatehpora
- Kumar Mohalla Akingam
- Qazigund
