= Devi Pora =

Village in India

Devi Pora Devipora
- Village
- Location in Jammu and Kashmir, India Devi Pora (India)
- Coordinates: 33.7281°N 75.2526°E
- Country: India
- State: Jammu and Kashmir
- District: Anantnag

Area
  - Total: 240.4 ha (594 acres)
- Elevation: 1,639 m (5,377 ft)

Population (2011)
  - Total: 1,509
  - Density: 627.7/km^{2} (1,626/sq mi)

Languages
  - Official: Kashmiri, Urdu, Hindi, Dogri, English
- Time zone: UTC+5:30 (IST)
- PIN: 192201
- Census code: 003669

Devi Pora, commonly known as Devipora, is a village in the Anantnag tehsil of Anantnag district in the Kashmir Valley of Jammu and Kashmir, India. It is situated 17 km away from the town of Achabal.

== Demographics ==
According to the 2011 Census of India, Devi Pora village has a total population of 1,509 people including 851 males and 658 females; and has a literacy rate of 53.74%.

Population	Total	Male	Female
Total Population	1,509	851	658
Literate Population	811	517	294
Illiterate Population	698	334	364
