= Kumar Mohalla Akingam =

- Location in Jammu & Kashmir, India Kumar Mohalla Akingam (India)
- Coordinates: 33.70°N 75.33°E
- Country: India
- Union Territory: Jammu & Kashmir
- Division: Kashmir
- District: Anantnag

Languages
  - Official: Kashmiri, Urdu, Hindi, Dogri, English

Kumar Mohalla is a part of Akingam village in the Anantnag district of Jammu and Kashmir, India and a part of tehsil Akingam.

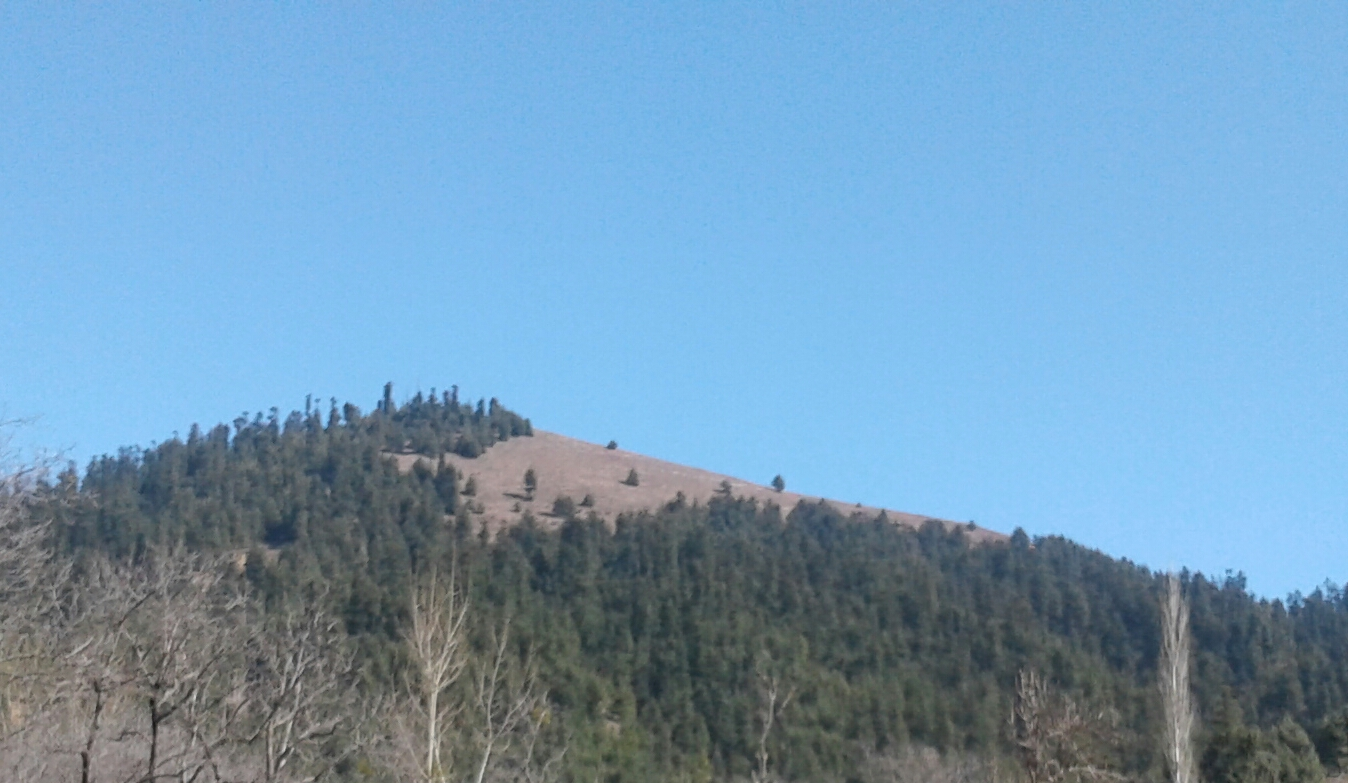
View of the mountain Zoon Maal from Kumar Mohalla

== See also ==
- Shiva Bhagwati Temple Akingam
