= Zaldora =

Zal dora or Zal dor (also called Zaldora) is a village in Doru Shahabad tehsil in Anantnag district in the Indian union territory of Jammu and Kashmir. It is one of 62 villages in Doru Shahabad Block along with villages like Hakura Badasgam and Hardu Dehrana.

== Demographics ==
Kashmiri is the Local Language here. Also People Speaks Urdu and Hindi. This is the only village in Anantnag district with Sikh population. This village contains more than 40 Sikh families. This village has two gurdwaras where all Sikhs worship twice a day.
