= Mughal architecture =

16th–18th-century Indo-Islamic architecture

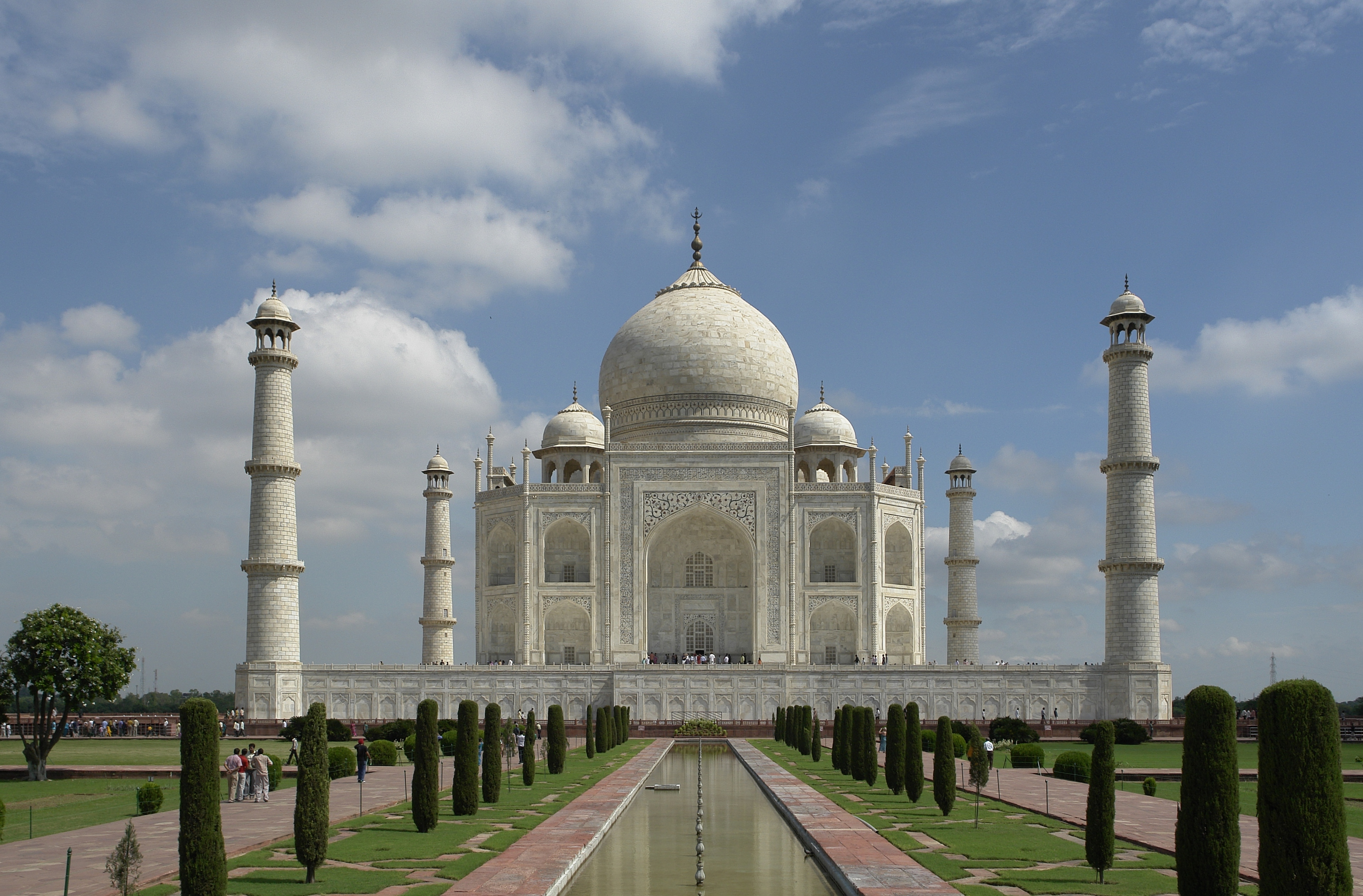
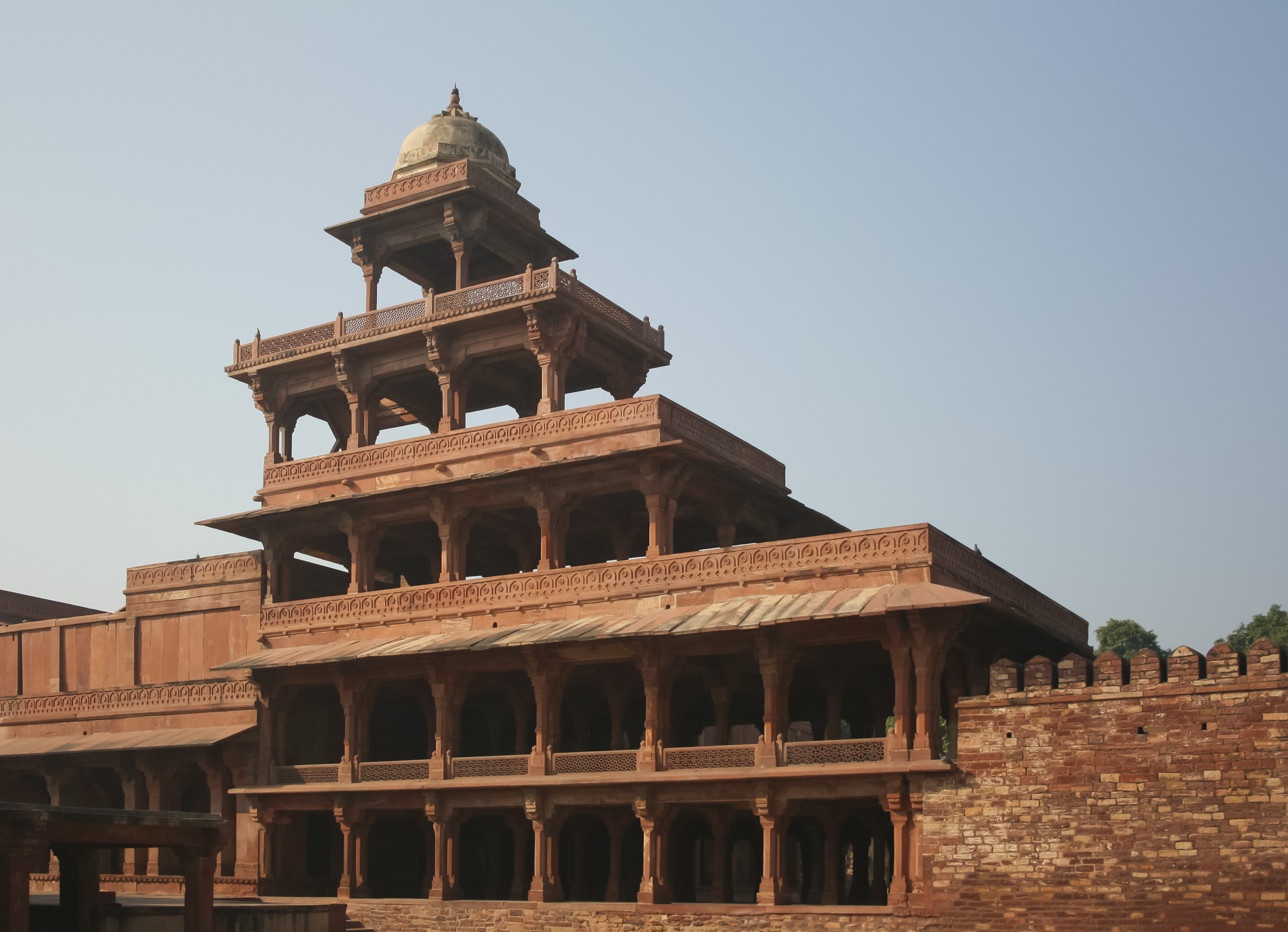
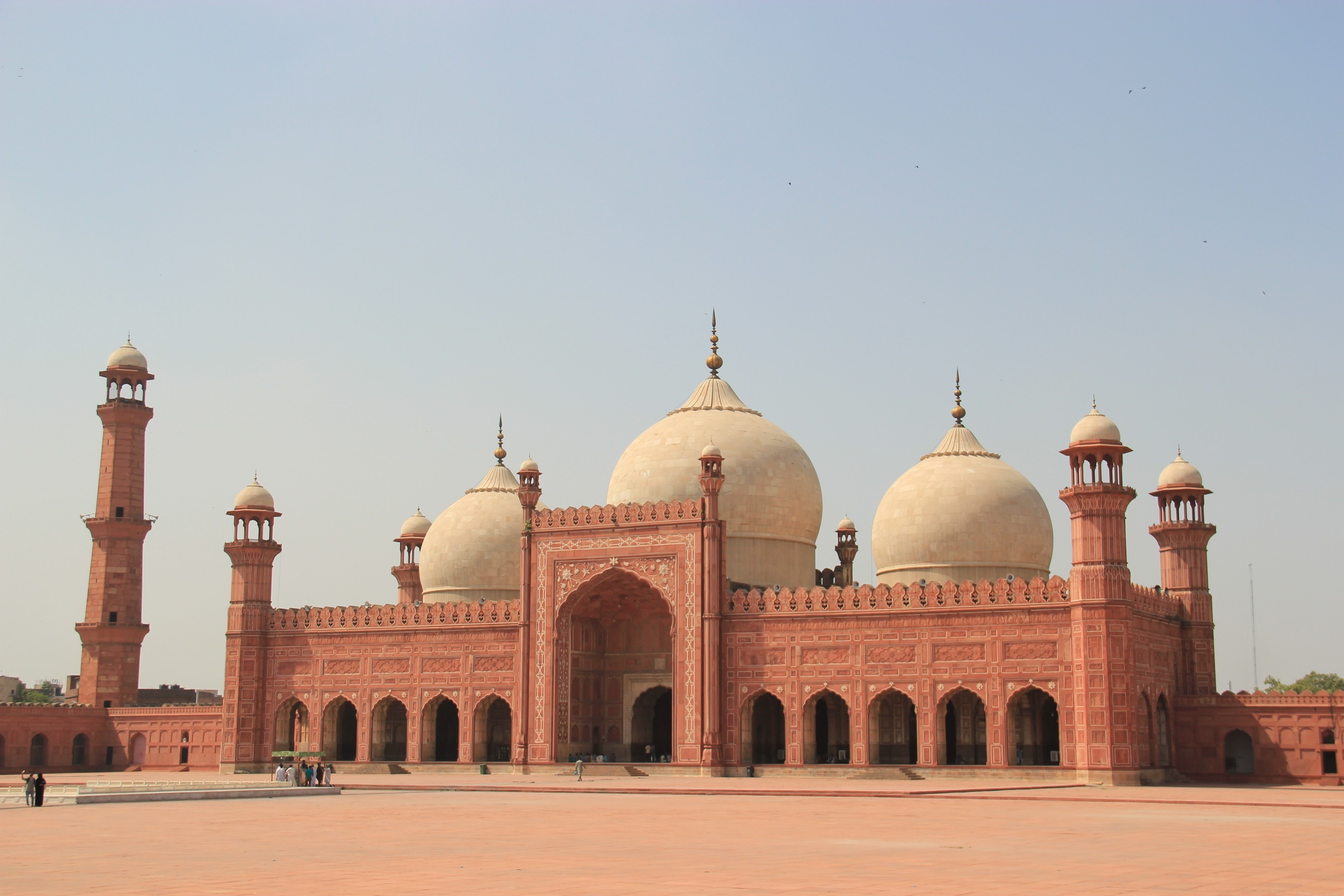
- Top: Taj Mahal in Agra, India, the most famous example of Mughal architecture and one of India's most recognisable landmarks; Middle: Panch Mahal in Fatehpur Sikri, India; Bottom: Badshahi Mosque in Lahore, Pakistan, the last and largest imperial mosque built by the Mughals
- Years active: 16th–19th centuries (primarily)

Mughal architecture is the style of architecture which developed in the Mughal Empire during the 16th–18th centuries throughout the ever-changing extent of their empire in South Asia. It developed from the architectural styles of earlier Indo-Islamic architecture and from Iranian and Central Asian architectural traditions, particularly the Timurid architecture. It also further incorporated and syncretized influences from wider Indian architecture, especially during the reign of Akbar (r. 1556–1605). Mughal buildings have a uniform pattern of structure and character, including large bulbous domes, slender minarets at the corners, massive halls, large vaulted gateways, and delicate ornamentation. Examples of the style are found mainly in modern-day India, Pakistan, Bangladesh, and Afghanistan.

The Mughal dynasty was established after the victory of Babur at Panipat in 1526. During his five-year reign, Babur took considerable interest in erecting buildings, though few have survived. His grandson Akbar commissioned extensive construction projects, and Mughal architectural style developed significantly during his reign. Among his accomplishments were Agra Fort and the fort-city of Fatehpur Sikri, which includes the Buland Darwaza. Akbar's son Jahangir commissioned the Shalimar Gardens of Srinagar.

Mughal architecture reached its zenith during the reign of Shah Jahan, who constructed the Taj Mahal, the Jama Masjid of Delhi, the Shalimar Gardens of Lahore, and renovated the Lahore Fort. High-ranking officials also constructed major monuments, as with the example of the Wazir Khan Mosque. The last of the great Mughal patrons was Aurangzeb, who commissioned the Badshahi Mosque, Bibi Ka Maqbara, Moti Masjid, among others. The style continued into 18th century but went into a decline, although it influenced regional and later architectural traditions, notably the Indo-Saracenic architecture during colonial period.

== Background ==
Mughal emperors and elites consciously used architecture as a way to publicly display their presence and power. The extensive architectural patronage of the Mughals was made possible by their considerable wealth, which exceeded that of other contemporary Muslim empires like the Ottomans and Safavids. In the Indian subcontinent, more monuments survive from the Mughal period than any other period. Major monuments of this time include mosques, mausoleums, palaces, gardens, and fortresses. Many of North India's largest temples were also built by Hindu mansabdars in the Mughal Empire, even as temple destruction also intermittently punctured the landscape.

The Mughal dynasty's founder, Babur, was initially based in Kabul, present-day Afghanistan. After the expansion into the Indian subcontinent, the imperial capital was, depending on the period, in Agra and Delhi, (present-day India), or Lahore (present-day Pakistan), along with other sites that served for short periods. In several cases, Mughal emperors commissioned new imperial cities as their capitals, such as Fatehpur Sikri by Akbar and Shahjahanabad by Shah Jahan. These capitals contain some of the greatest displays of Mughal monumental architecture, but imperial patronage was also directed across various cities and rural sites throughout the empire.

Mughal architecture was derived from three main architectural traditions: the architecture of Islamic Persia and Central Asia, local Indo-Islamic architecture, and indigenous Hindu architecture. Because earlier Indo-Islamic architecture already borrowed from both Hindu and Islamic architectural styles, certain influences in Mughal architecture can be difficult to attribute to one source or the other. With regards to Hindu architecture, local Rajput palaces were a key influence.

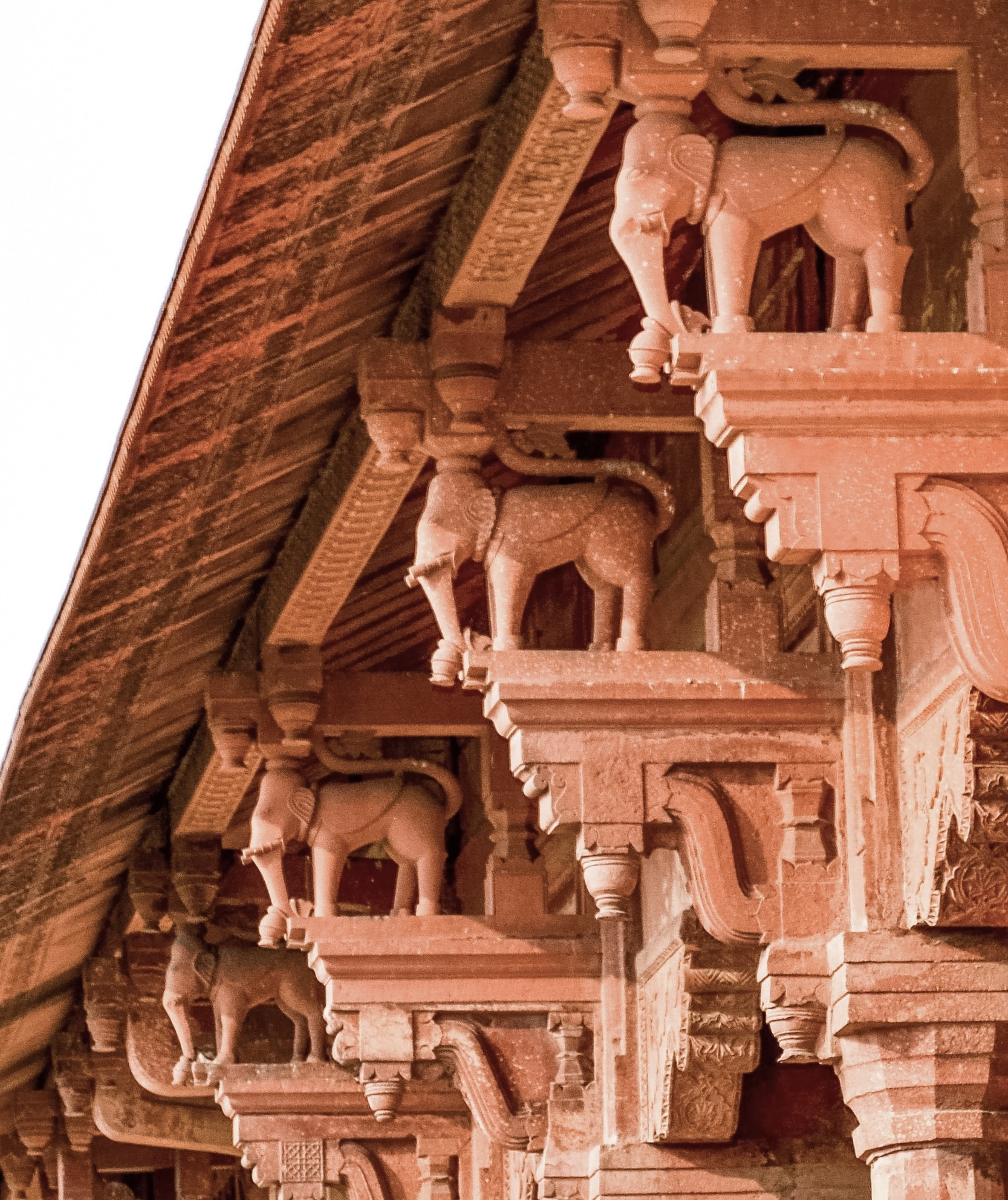
The use of elephant-shaped column brackets at Lahore Fort reflects Hindu influences on Mughal architecture during the reign of Akbar.

Early Mughal architecture developed from existing Indo-Islamic architecture while following the model of Timurid architecture (based in Central Asia), due in part to the Timurid ancestry of Babur. By the late 16th century, a more distinctive Mughal tradition emerged based on the combination of these two sources.

Under the reign of Akbar (r. 1556–1605), the use of Hindu architectural elements was especially prolific, including in high-profile construction projects like Fatehpur Sikri. During his reign in particular, non-Muslims were present among the highest-ranking officials and were able to become patrons of architecture as well. The most notable example is Raja Man Singh, a Hindu amir who commissioned both Hindu temples and Muslim mosques and shrines.

Under Akbar's successors, there was a shift towards more typically Islamic architectural designs. During the reign of Shah Jahan (r. 1628–1658), a "classical" Mughal style was consolidated and remained essentially in use until the end of the Mughal period. A certain level of stylistic consistency was achieved throughout the empire at this period thanks to the role of a central department of architects, similar to the imperial architects that existed in the Ottoman Empire.

== Characteristics ==
=== General ===
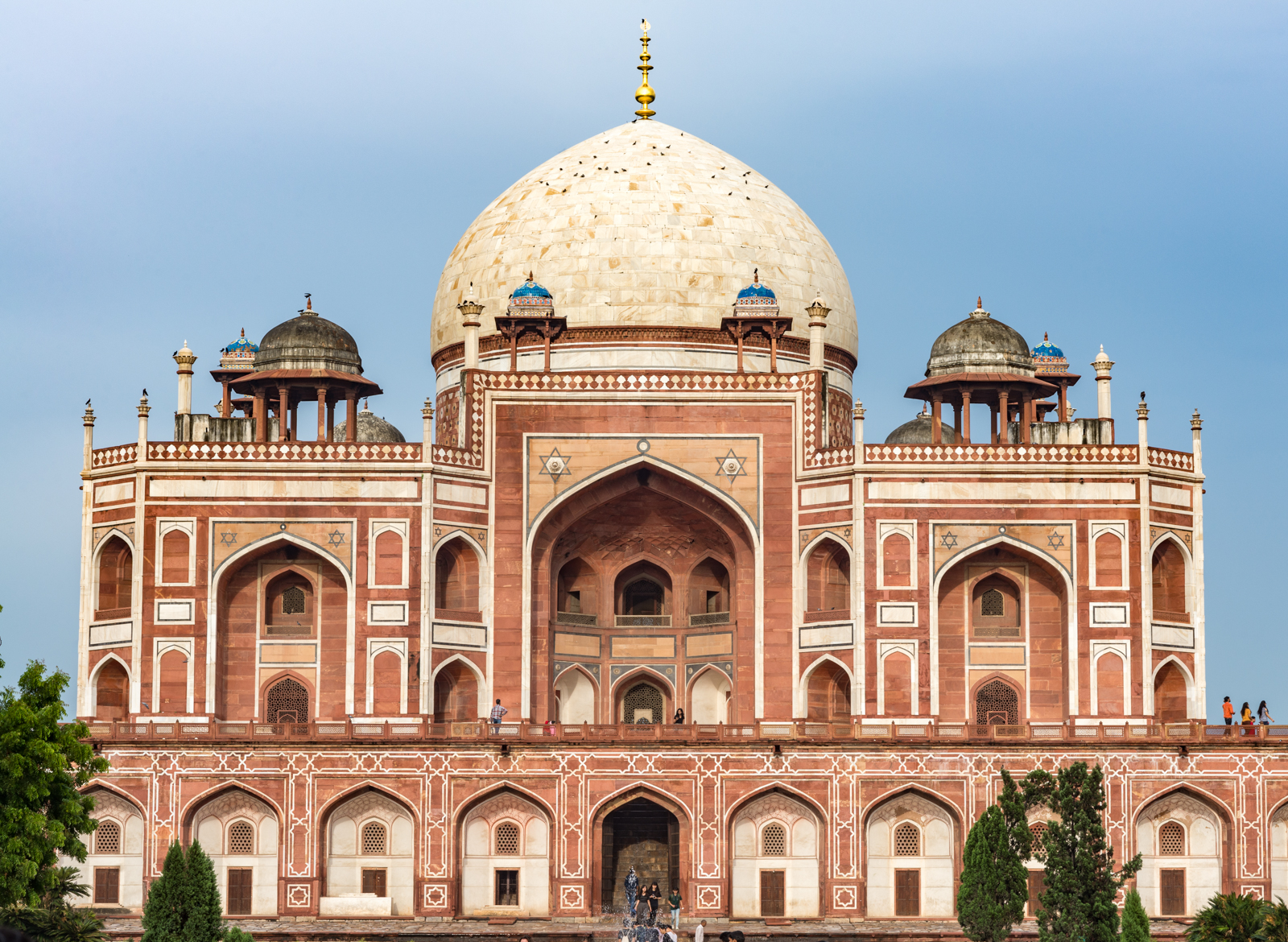
Tomb of Humayun, with exterior iwans, four-centred pointed arches, and a central bulbous dome visible

Mughal architecture is distinguished by an elegant style in which careful linear divisions of spaces and surfaces took priority over the more three-dimensional combination of elements that distinguished earlier Indo-Islamic architecture. The use of colour was also relatively restrained, with emphasis instead on finishing surfaces with high-quality, polished materials. Bulbous domes and ogive arches were among the most prominent recurring elements. In addition to domes and arches, the local tradition of trabeate construction also continued, especially in secular architecture, like palaces.

Another distinguishing characteristic was the use of red sandstone as a building material, along with white marble. This replaced the prominence of brick in earlier Indo-Islamic architecture, though construction materials still varied depending on the region. Sandstone is a very hard material, but local Indian stonemasons were skilled in carving it with intricate detail, which was another distinguishing feature of the Mughal style. White marble was initially used as a cladding to complement and finish the look of sandstone buildings, as in Tomb of Humayun, but later it was used on a grander scale to cover entire buildings, as in the Taj Mahal. Brick was sometimes still used for domes and arches, but in these cases it was usually faced with plaster or stone as a finish.

=== Decoration ===
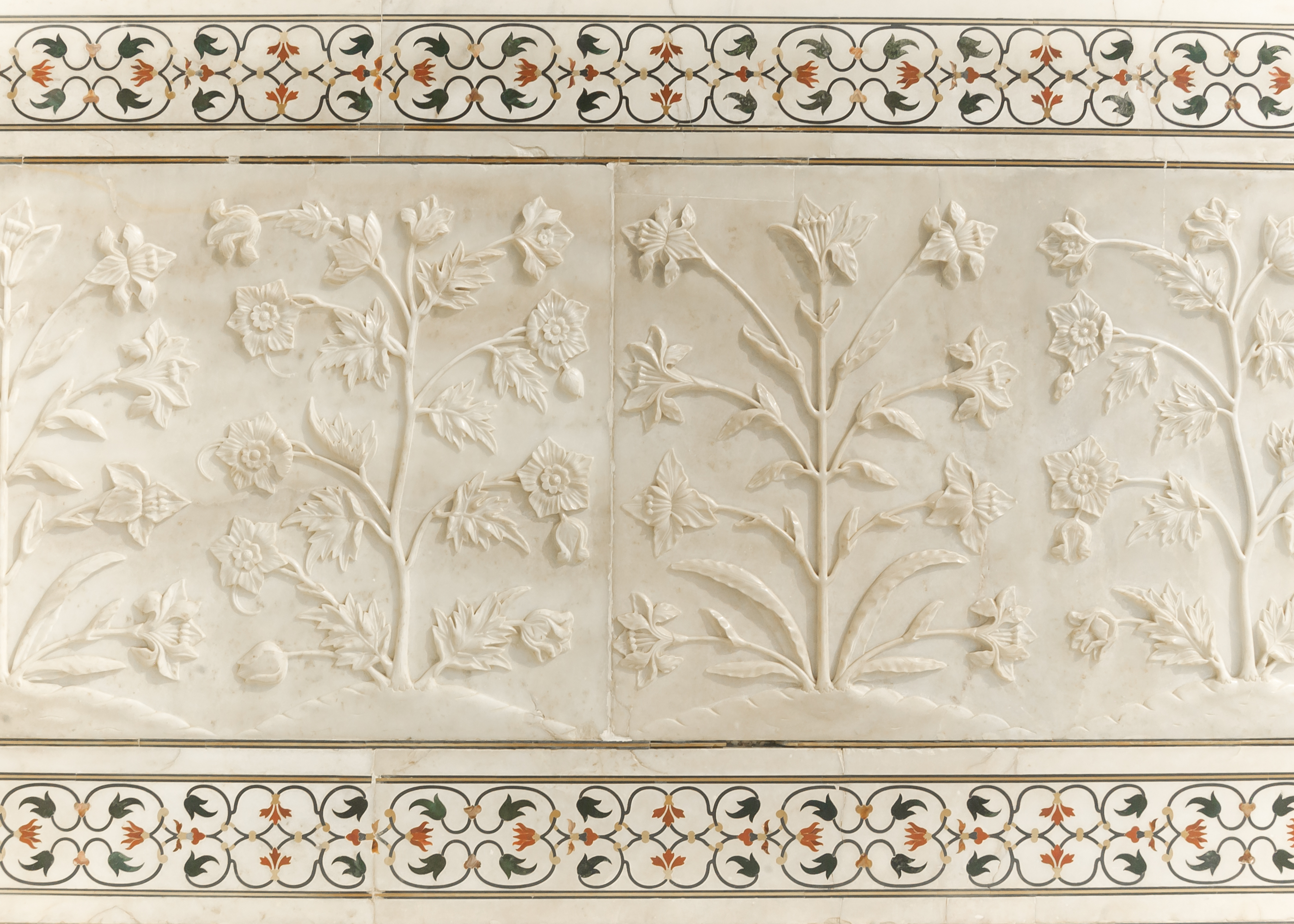
Example of carved flower reliefs on marble and pietra dura (parchin kari) inlaid stonework above and below, at the Taj Mahal

Decorative motifs included geometric and floral designs, as well as elaborate inscriptions in Arabic, Persian, and even in local languages during the late Mughal period. Decoration was commonly executed in tile or stone.

Tilework was more commonly applied to the exterior of buildings and existed in two main types: cuerda seca and mosaic tilework. Cuerda seca tiles were decorated with coloured glazes separated by dark lines, while mosaic tilework consisted of single-coloured tile pieces that were cut and fitted together to create larger patterns.

Stonework was of high quality and marks one of the most sophisticated aspects of Mughal decoration. Carved stonework included ornately sculpted pillars and corbels, flat panels carved in low relief with depictions of flowers, and pierced marble screens known as jalis. Pietra dura, known as parchin kari in the Indian subcontinent, was the technique of decorating with inlaid stone. It developed in this region independently from the Italian technique that is widely known elsewhere.

=== Influences ===
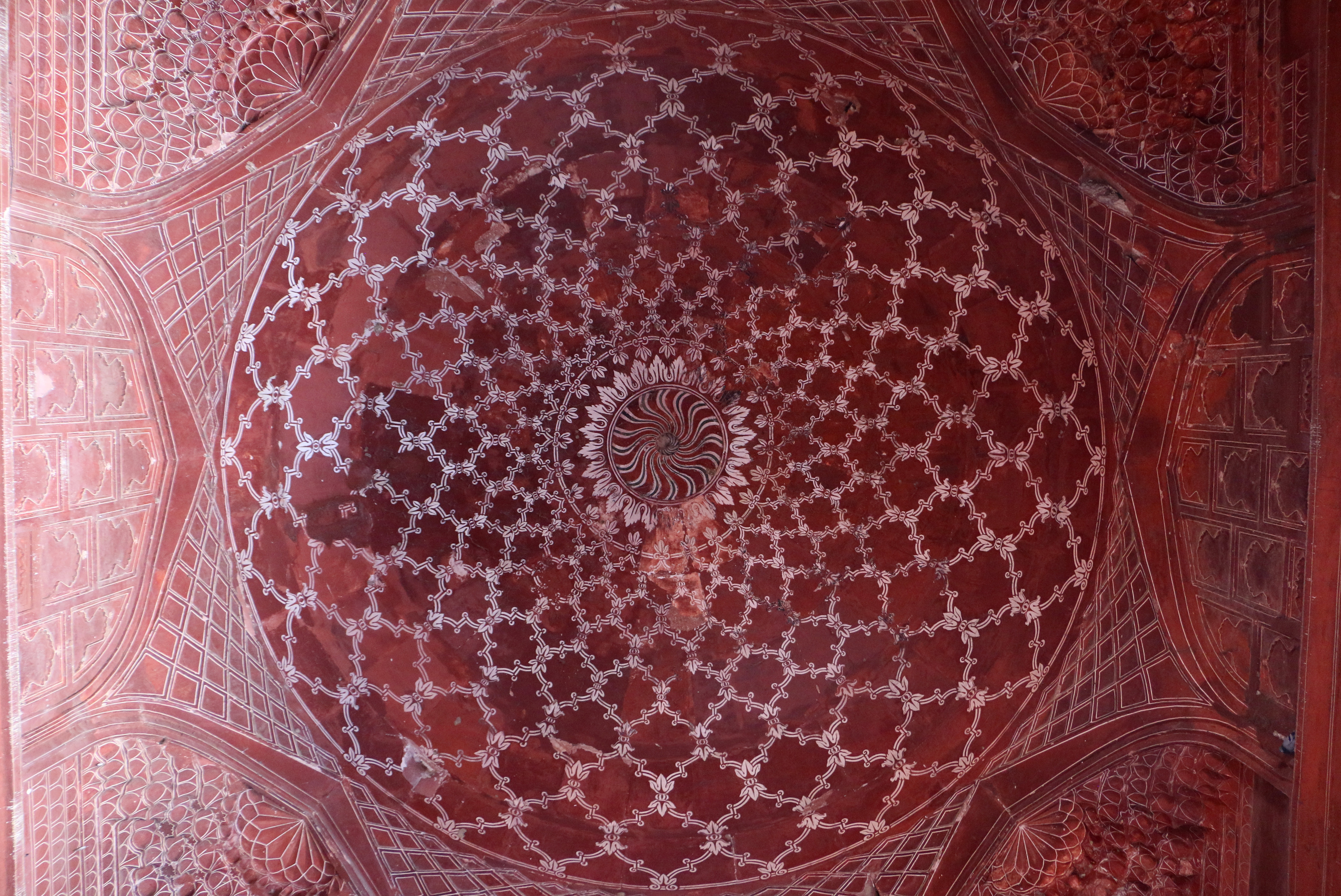
Dome with corner squinches in the mosque of the Taj Mahal complex

Elements of earlier Indo-Islamic architecture that continued in Mughal architecture are the cusped multifoil arches, which appeared earlier in the architecture of Delhi and Gujarat sultanates, as well as the do-chala roof, a feature originating in Bengali architecture that was adopted in the architecture of the Bengal Sultanate.

Features of Persian or Central Asian (Timurid) influence were the iwan (a vaulted space open to one side), the use of domes, the pointed four-centred arch, the use of decorative tilework, and the chahar bagh type of garden, along with various other motifs and building layouts. In dome construction, Persian-style squinches were used in some cases, but in other cases the domes were supported by flat beams over the corners of the chamber.

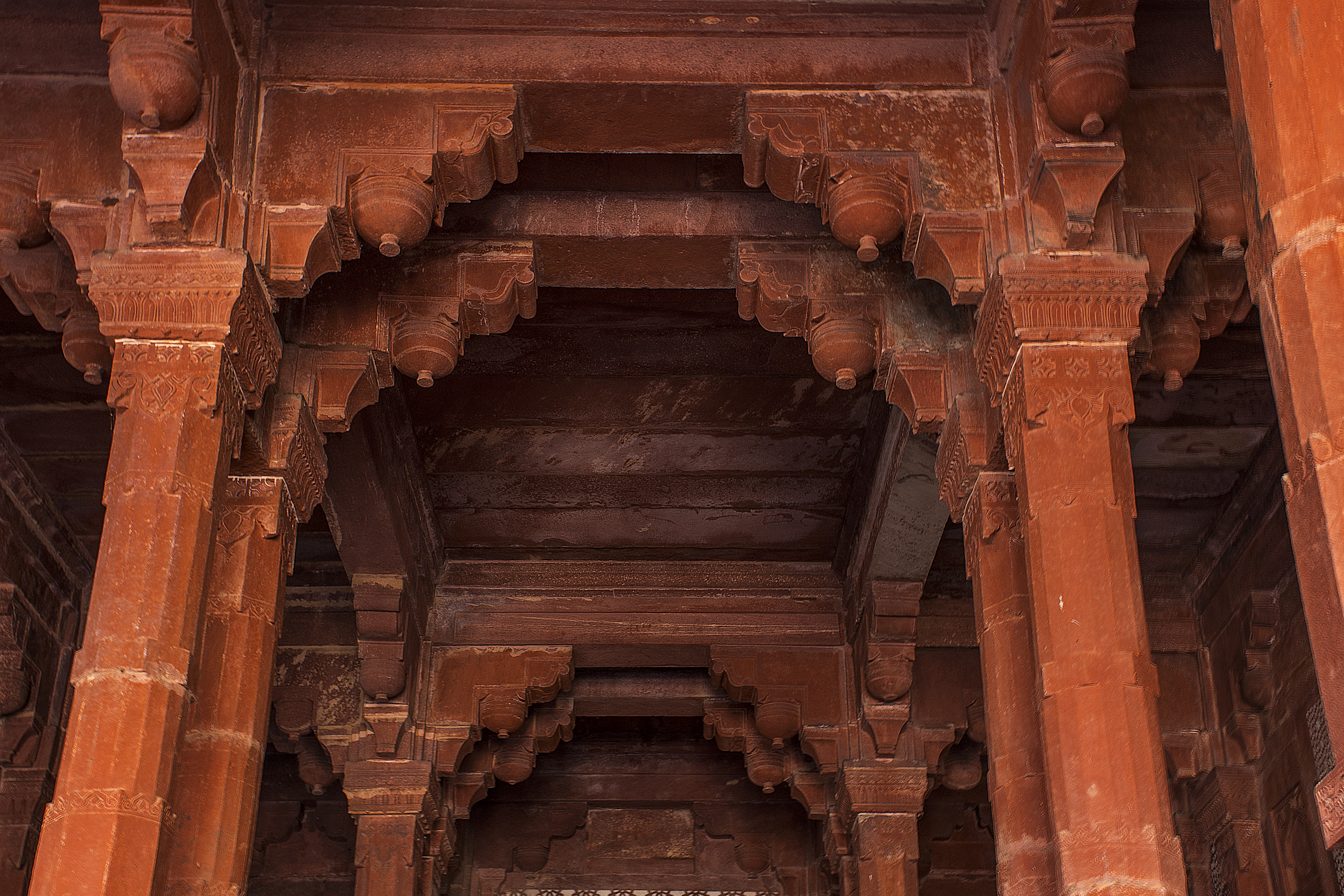
Example of trabeate and corbelled constructions in the mosque of Fatehpur Sikri

Elements of Mughal architecture that demonstrate Hindu influences include the use of trabeate constructions, the use of corbel arches instead of arches with voussoirs, and the style of ornately carved pillars. Jharokhas (projecting balconies), chhatris (domed kiosks), and chhajjas (wide stone eaves) are also elements that were borrowed from local Hindu architecture and became very popular in Mughal architecture. Some elements, such as projecting balconies, had parallels in Islamic architecture elsewhere but their specific Mughal forms were of local inspiration.

=== Major building types ===
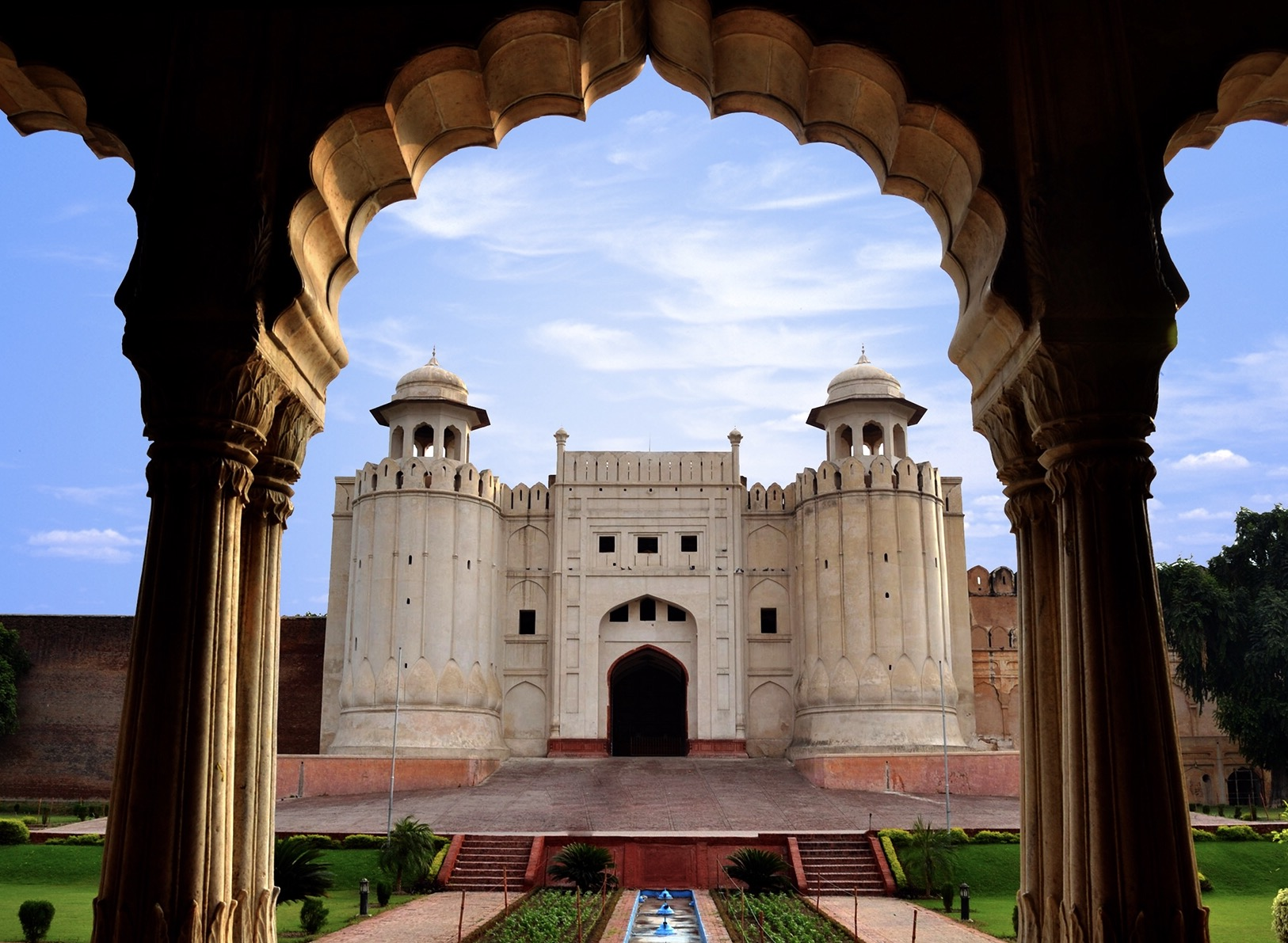
The Alamgiri Gate at Lahore Fort, Lahore, Pakistan

==== Military buildings ====
Large fortified citadels or palace complexes, such as the Agra Fort and the Red Fort in Delhi, were enclosed in massive walls reinforced by semi-circular towers and entered via monumental gateways. Inside, the classic Mughal palace was laid out with symmetrical gardens and various pavilions. Open pavilions with rows of cusped arches were a recurring feature. Rich decoration was used to embellish rooms and halls.

==== Gardens ====
Gardens were a favourite concern of Mughal emperors, whether they were created as separate, dedicated garden sites or as the setting for pavilions and mausoleums within larger architectural complexes. They were laid out in a formal manner with terraces, precise divisions, and water features.

==== Mosques ====
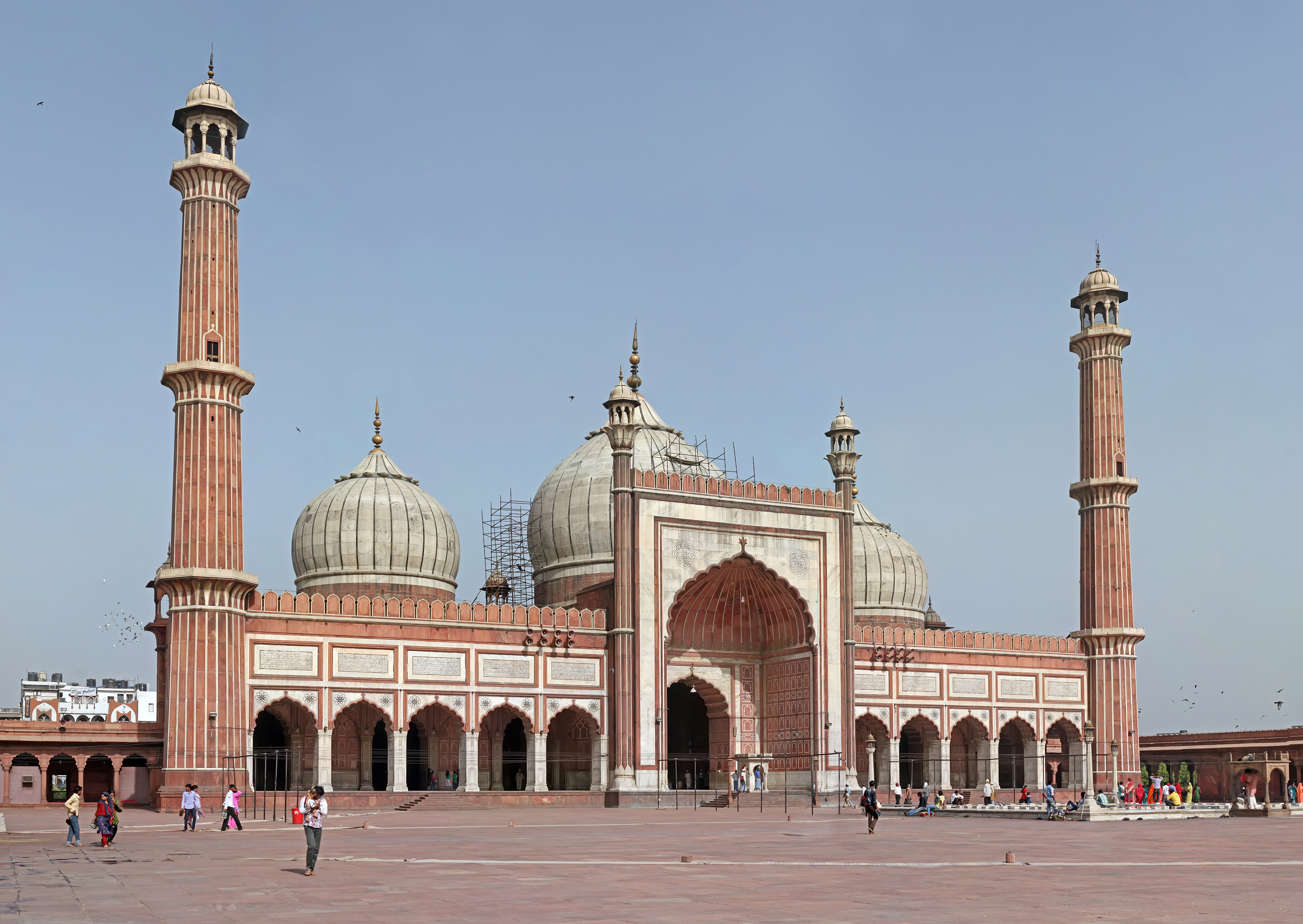
View of the courtyard, prayer hall, and minarets of the Jama Masjid, Delhi

Mosques were relatively more restrained in their decoration but were built on a grand scale. The typical mosque layout in the classic Mughal era involved a large rectangular courtyard surrounded by an arcade on three sides and a prayer hall on one side. The prayer hall consisted of a wide vaulted hall fronted by an arcade of monumental arches, with the central archway consisting of a larger iwan rising above the others.

The most monumental and elaborate Mughal structures were royal mausoleums, deliberately designed to show off the power and sophistication of their patrons. The classic Mughal tomb was an octagonal or rectangular structure with a central dome and outer iwans, raised on a terraced platform.

==== Temples ====
Although the Mughals were a Muslim dynasty and heavily favoured the construction of Islamic sites, their alliances with local communities and kingdoms encouraged the building of other religious structures such as temples. During the reign of Akbar, religious freedoms substantially improved, leading to various farmans for the construction of temples.

Interior of Govind Dev Temple, Vrindavan, Mughal Braj

Jugal Kishor Temple, Vrindavan, Mughal Braj

Sati Burj, Mathura, Mughal Braj

Madan Mohan Temple, Vrindavan, Mughal Braj

Chaturbhuj Temple, Orchha, Mughal Chambal

Vanvasi Temple, Orchha, Mughal Chambal

Radhika Bihari Temple, Orchha, Mughal Chambal

==== Other structures ====
Other public buildings and infrastructure works included roads, milestones (known as kos minar), caravanserais (inns for merchants and travelers), and bridges. These were more functional in nature and less decorative, though some caravanserais were embellished with elaborate gateways.

== Monuments ==
=== Babur ===
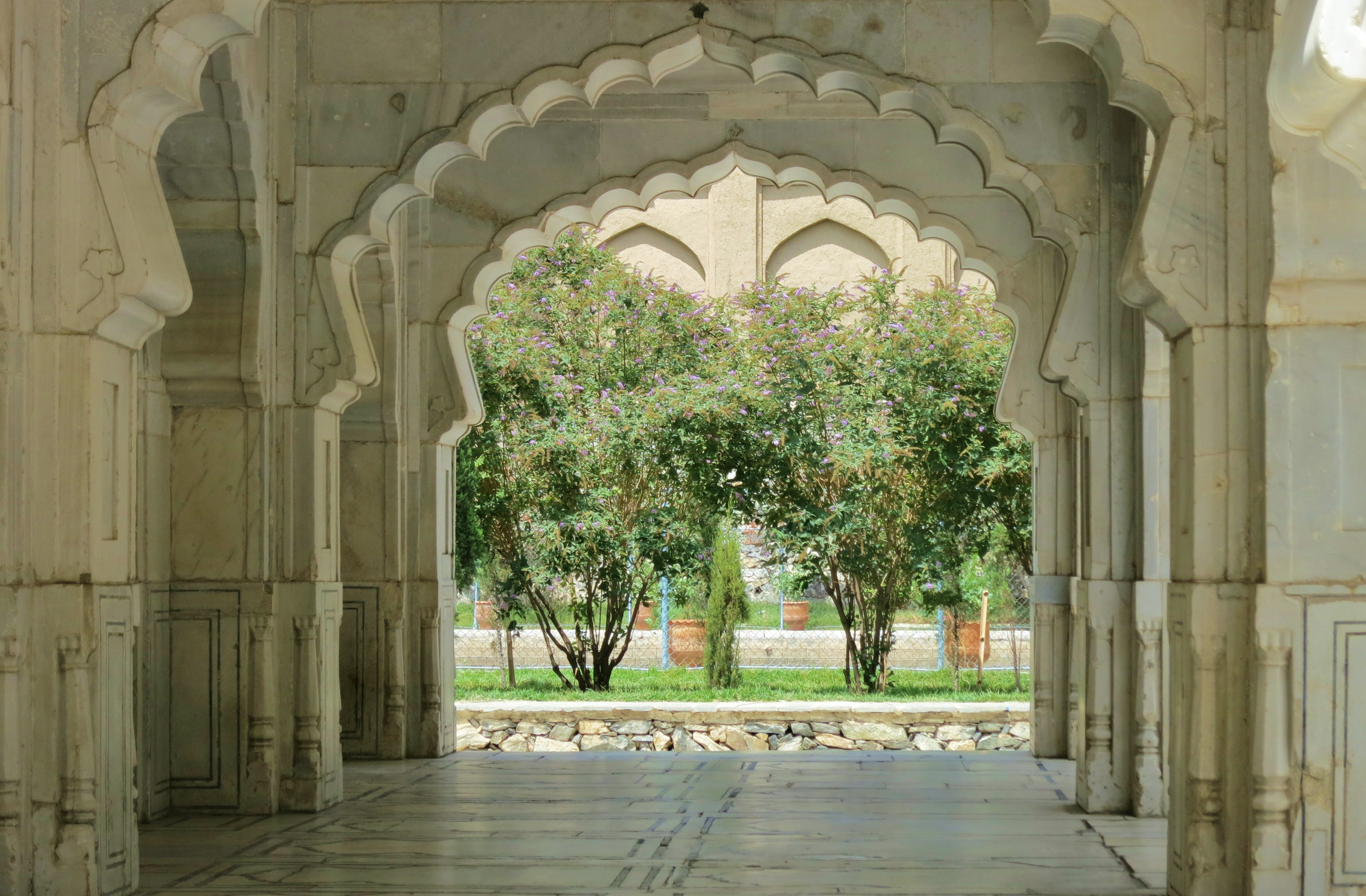
Gardens of Babur in Kabul, Afghanistan.

The architectural patronage of Babur, the first Mughal emperor, is mainly known for its terraced gardens. These gardens, often established in palaces and citadels, were modeled on the Persian chahar bagh ("four gardens") type, in which gardens are geometrically divided into different plots, usually four equal parts. This type followed Timurid antecedents, though the use of water channels as linear dividers may have been a Mughal innovation. Babur himself was initially buried at Agra, but in 1644 his tomb was moved to one of his favourite gardens in Kabul, now known as the Gardens of Babur. Some of the architecture Babur created in the present-day India includes Aram Bagh in Agra, Lotus Garden in Dholpur and more.

In religious architecture, Babur's mosques also followed the designs of earlier Timurid mosques, with a tall central entrance portal (pishtaq), a courtyard, and a prayer hall covered by a large central dome flanked by side aisles covered by smaller domes. An example of this is his mosque at Panipat.

=== Humayun ===
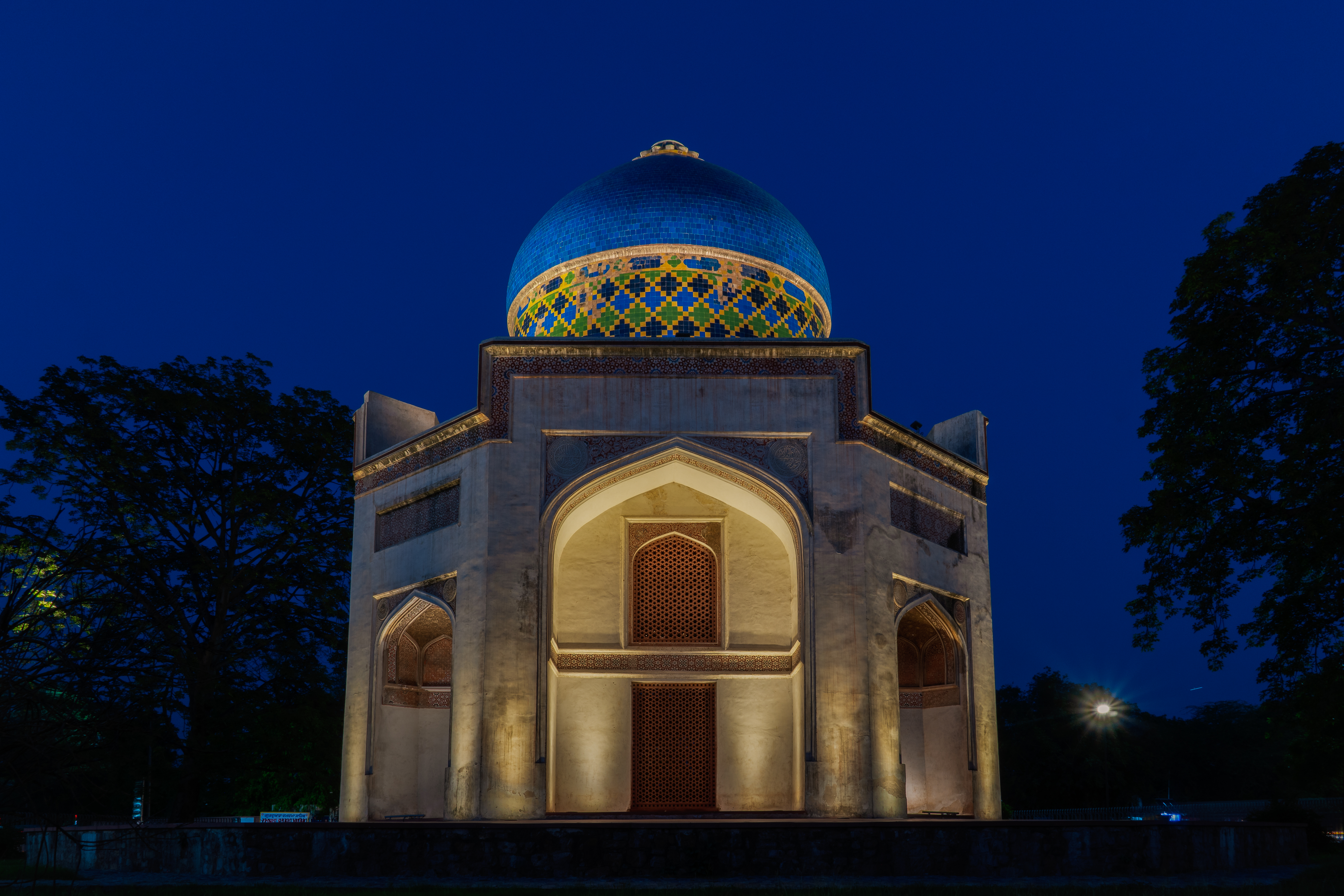
Sabz Burj, a Mughal-era mausoleum in Delhi

=== Akbar I ===
==== Agra Fort ====
Agra Fort is a UNESCO World Heritage Site in Agra, Uttar Pradesh. The major part of Agra fort was commissioned by Akbar from 1565 to 1574. The architecture of the fort clearly indicates the free adoption of the Rajput planning and construction. Some of the important buildings in the fort are Jahangiri Mahal built for Jahangir and his family, the Moti Masjid, and Mena Bazaars. The Jahangiri Mahal has a courtyard surrounded by double-storeyed halls and rooms.

==== Humayun's Tomb ====
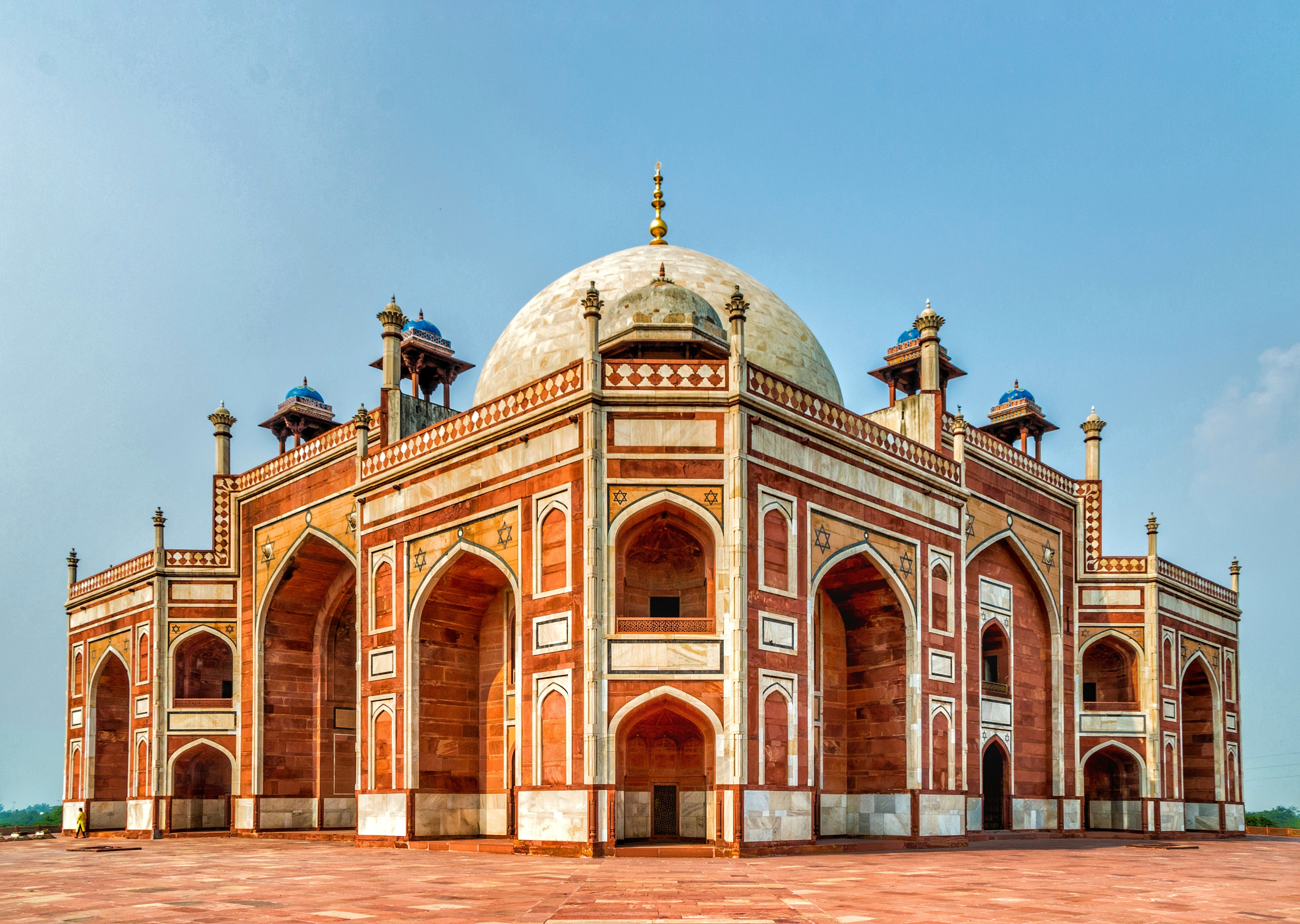
view of the Humayun's Tomb from the southwest corner

The tomb of Mughal Emperor Humayun is located in Delhi, India. It was commissioned by Humayun's first wife and chief consort, Empress Bega Begum (also known as Haji Begum), in 1569–70, and designed by Mirak Mirza Ghiyas and his son, Sayyid Muhammad, Persian architects chosen by her. It was the first garden-tomb on the Indian subcontinent. It is often regarded as the first mature example of Mughal architecture.

==== Fatehpur Sikri ====
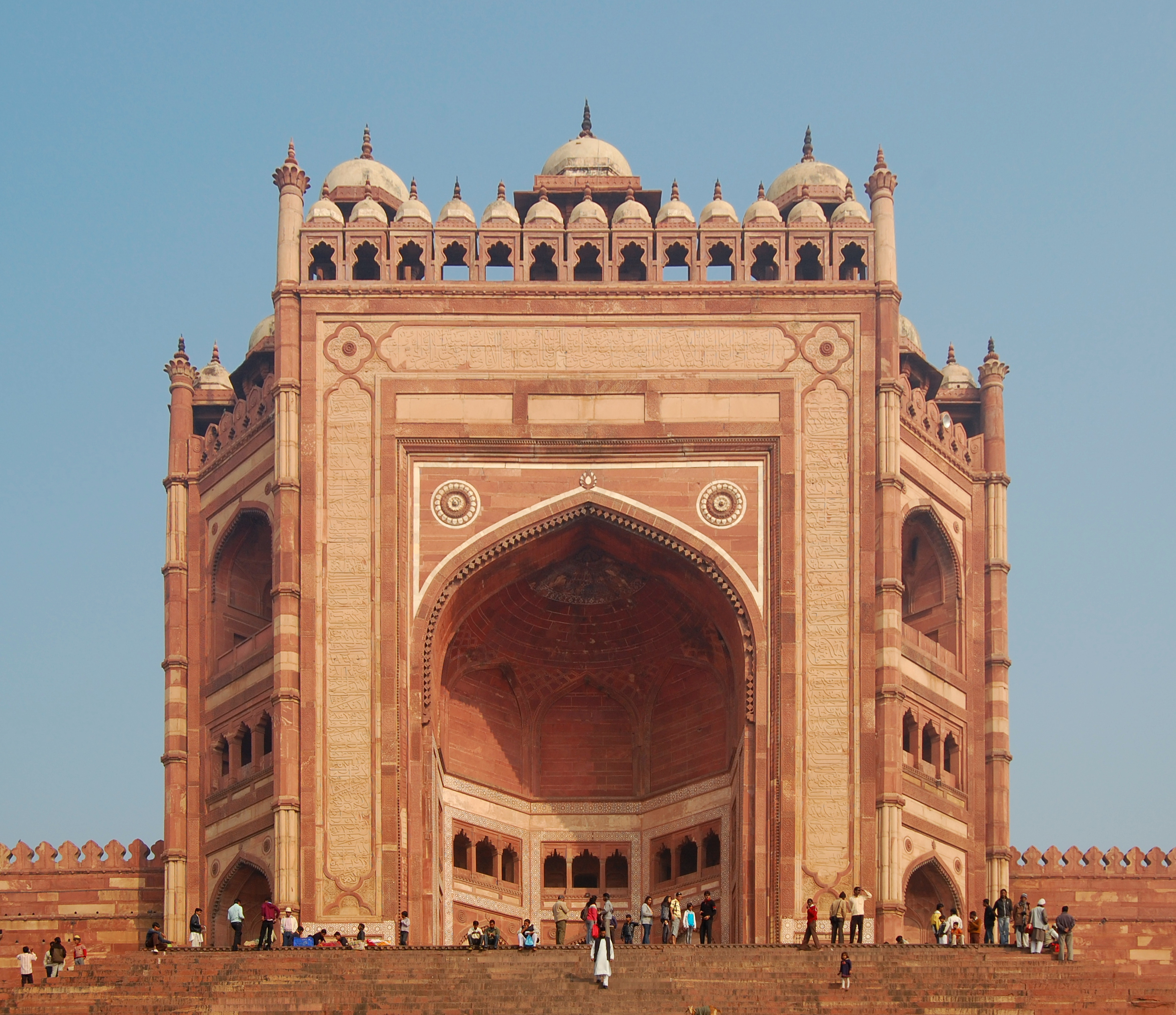
Buland Darwaza, Fatehpur Sikri, was commissioned by Akbar the Great to commemorate his victory.

Akbar's greatest architectural achievement was the construction of Fatehpur Sikri, his capital city near Agra at a trade and Jain pilgrimages. The construction of the walled city was started in 1569 and completed in 1574.

It contained some of the most beautiful buildings – both religious and secular which testify to the Emperor's aim of achieving social, political and religious integration. The main religious buildings were the huge Jama Masjid and small Tomb of Salim Chishti. Buland Darwaza, also known as the Gate of Magnificence, was commissioned by Akbar in 1576 to commemorate his victory over Gujarat and the Deccan. It is 40 metres high and 50 metres from the ground. The total height of the structure is about 54 metres from ground level.

The Haramsara, the royal seraglio in Fatehpur Sikri was an area where the royal women lived. The opening to the Haramsara is from the Khwabgah side separated by a row of cloisters. According to Abul Fazl, in Ain-i-Akbari, the inside of Harem was guarded by senior and active women, outside the enclosure the eunuchs were placed, and at a proper distance there were faithful Rajput guards.

Jodha Bai Mahal is the largest palace in the Fatehpur Sikri seraglio, connected to the minor haramsara quarters. The main entrance is double storied, projecting out of the facade to create a kind of porch leading into a recessed entrance with a balcony. Inside there is a quadrangle surrounded by rooms. The columns of rooms are ornamented with a variety of Hindu sculptural motifs.

==== Tomb of Salim Chishti ====
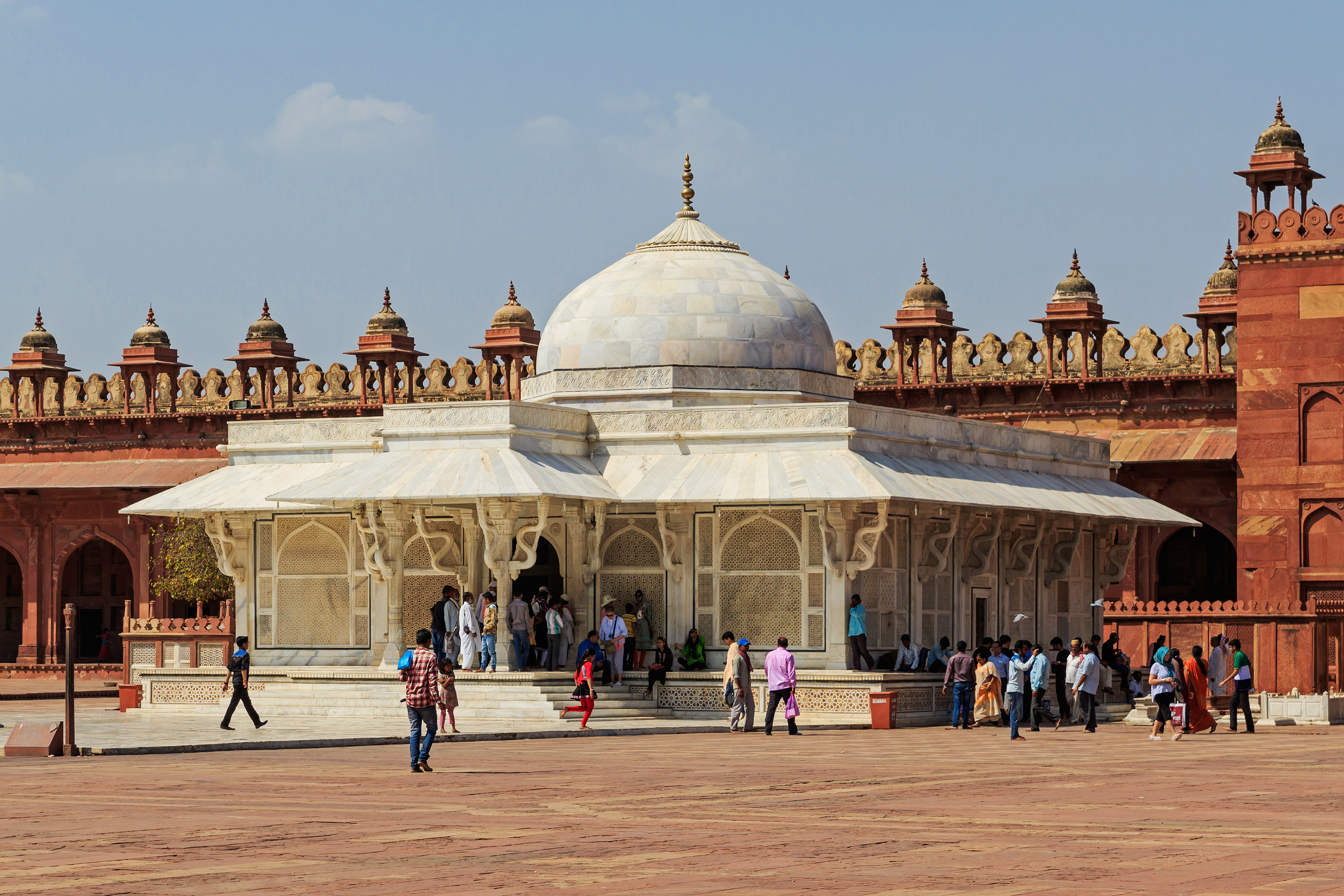
The tomb of Salim Chishti is considered to be one of the finest examples of Mughal architecture

The Tomb of Salim Chishti is famed as one of the finest examples of Mughal architecture in India, built during the years 1580 and 1581. The tomb, built in 1571 in the corner of the mosque compound, is a square marble chamber with a verandah. The cenotaph has an exquisitely designed lattice screen around it. It enshrines the burial place of the Sufi saint, Salim Chishti (1478 – 1572), a descendant of Khwaja Moinuddin Chishti of Ajmer, who lived in a cavern on the ridge at Sikri. The mausoleum, constructed by Akbar as a mark of his respect for the Sufi saint, who foretold the birth of his son.

=== Jahangir ===
==== Tomb of I'timād-ud-Daulah ====
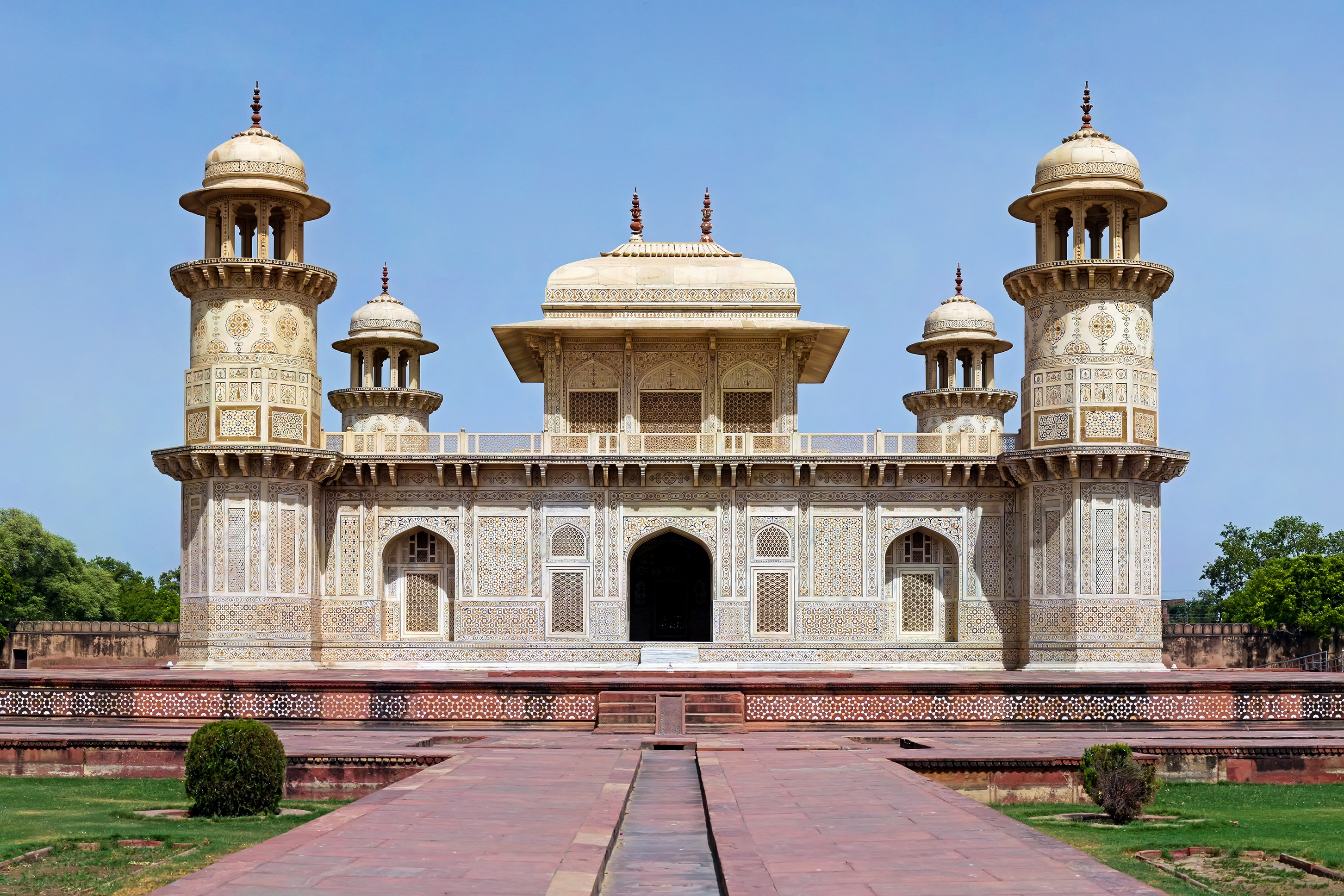
The tomb of I'timād-ud-Daulah is often regarded as a draft of the Tāj Mahal.

The tomb of I'timād-ud-Daulah, is a mausoleum in the city of Agra in the Indian state of Uttar Pradesh. Often described as a "jewel box", sometimes called the "Bachcha Taj", as the tomb of I'timād-ud-Daulah is often regarded as a draft of the Taj Mahal.

=== Shah Jahan ===
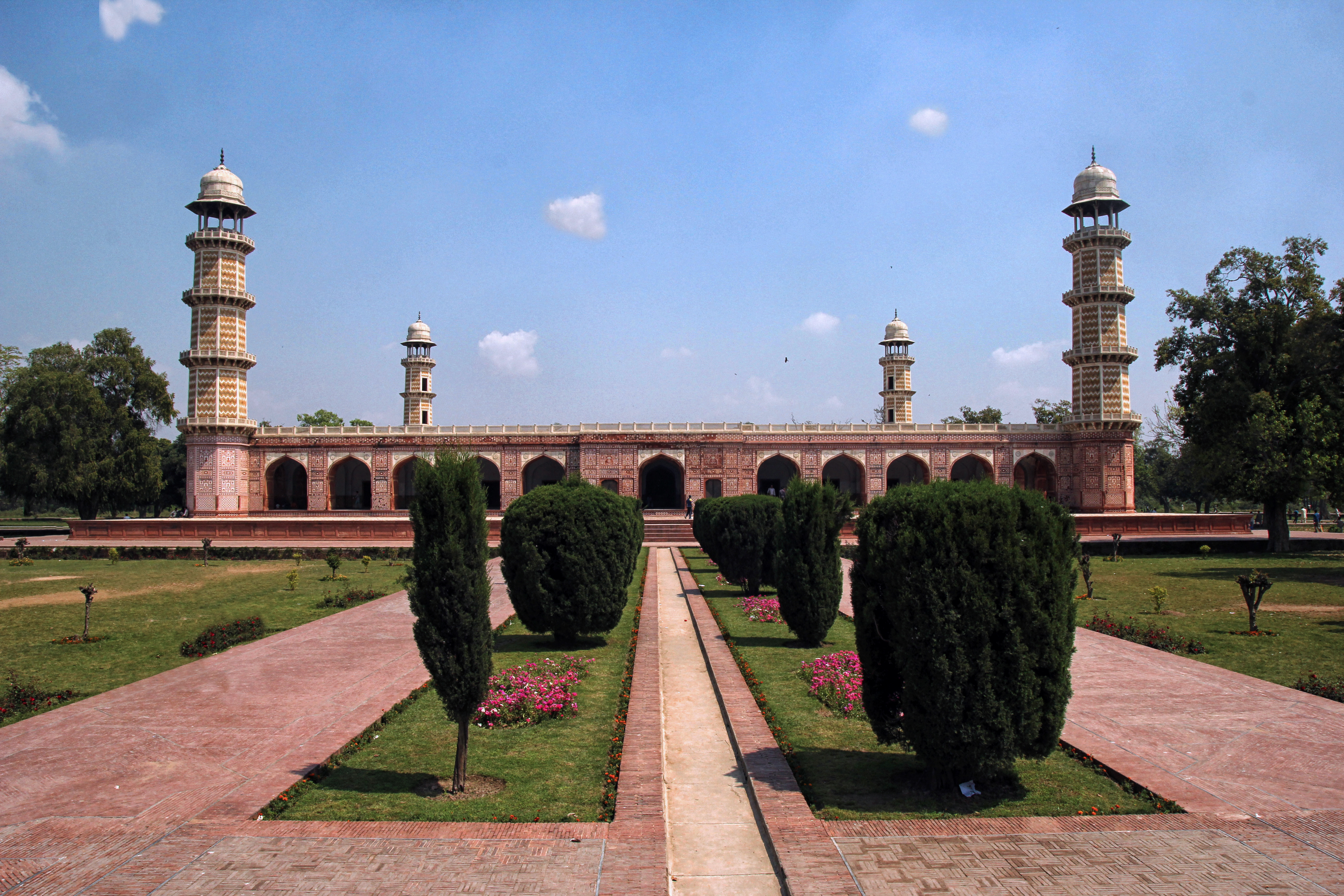
The Tomb of Jahangir at Lahore does not have a dome as Jahangir forbade construction of a dome over his tomb.

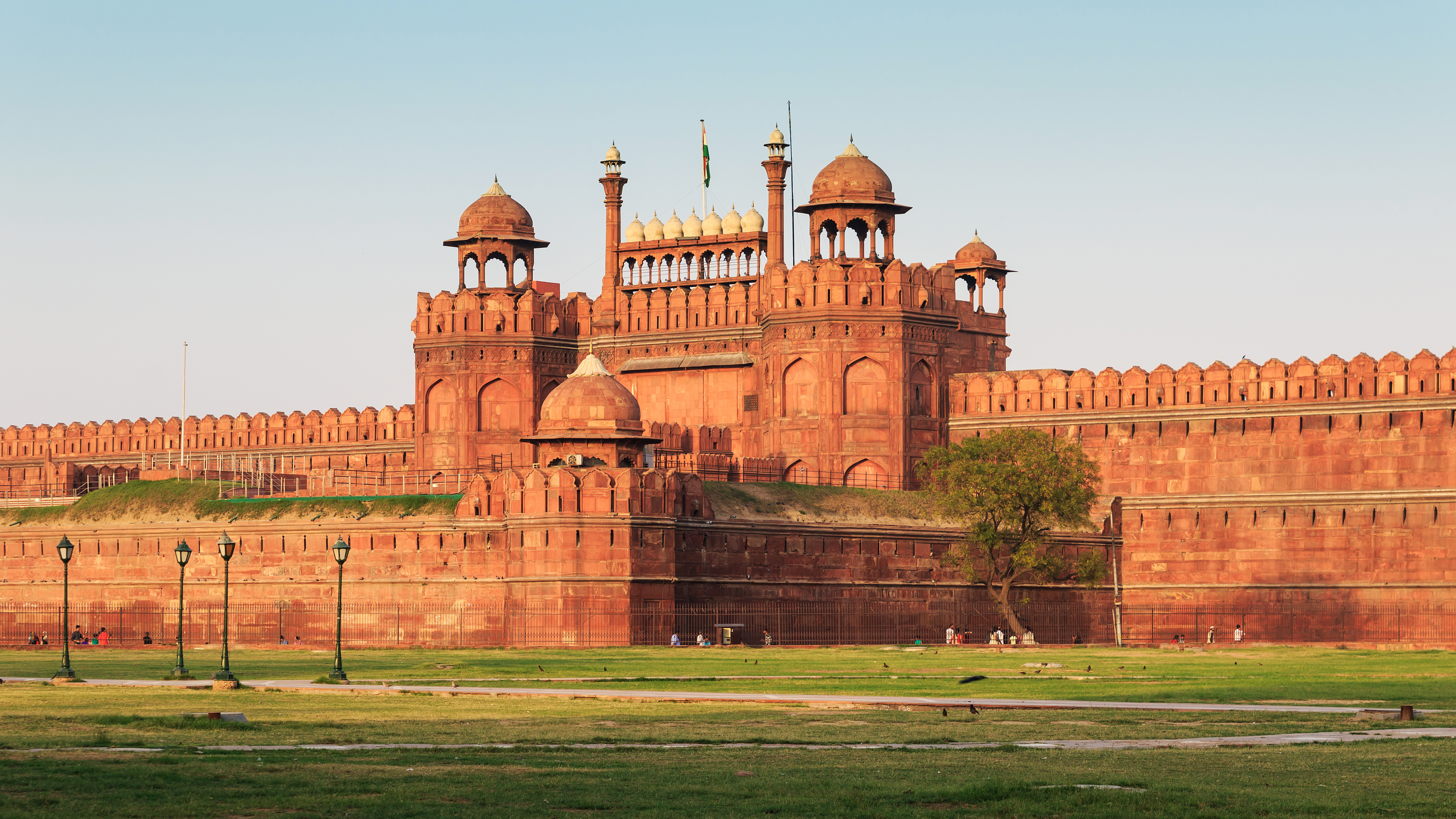
Lahori Gate of the Red Fort in Delhi

Rather than building huge monuments like his predecessors to demonstrate their power, Shah Jahan commissioned elegant monuments. The force and originality of this previous building style gave way under Shah Jahan to a delicate elegance and refinement of detail, illustrated in the palaces erected during his reign at Agra, Delhi and Lahore. Some examples include the Taj Mahal at Agra, the tomb of his wife Mumtaz Mahal, under the chief architect Ustad Ahmad Lahori. He was said to have personal a preference for white marble in architecture, as in the Taj Mahal. Although some buildings built during his era were made of red sandstone, such as the Red Fort in Delhi, he preferred to use white marble for his private quarters.

The Moti Masjid (Pearl Mosque) in the Agra Fort and the Jama Masjid at Delhi, the latter built under the supervision of his Punjabi Grand Vizier, Sa'adullah Khan, are imposing buildings of his era, and their position and architecture have been carefully considered so as to produce a pleasing effect and feeling of spacious elegance and well-balanced proportion of parts. Shah Jahan also renovated buildings such as the Moti Masjid, Sheesh Mahal and Naulakha pavilion, which are all enclosed in the Lahore Fort. He also commissioned a mosque named after himself in Thatta called Shahjahan Mosque, built in a style deeply influenced by Safavid and Timurid architecture. Shah Jahan also commissioned the Red Fort in his new capital at Shah Jahanabad, now Old Delhi. The red sandstone Red Fort is noted for its special buildings: Diwan-i-Aam and Diwan-i-Khas. Another mosque was built during his tenure in Lahore called Wazir Khan Mosque, by Wazir Khan who was the court physician to the emperor. It is famous for its rich embellishment which covers almost every interior surface. Other public works by high ranking nobles of Shah Jahan include those of Ali Mardan Khan, Wazir Khan, Nasiri Khan, and Kartalab Khan Deccani.

==== Taj Mahal ====
The Taj Mahal, a World Heritage Site was built between 1632 and 1653; commissioned by the emperor Shah Jahan in memory of his wife Mumtaz Mahal. Its construction took 22 years and required 22,000 laborers and 1,000 elephants, at a cost of 32 million rupees. (corresponding to US$ 827 million in 2015) It is a large, white marble structure standing on a square plinth and consists of a symmetrical building with an iwan (an arch-shaped doorway) topped by a large dome and finial.

The building's longest plane of symmetry runs through the entire complex except for the sarcophagus of Shah Jahan, which is placed off centre in the crypt room below the main floor. This symmetry is extended to the building of an entire mirror mosque in red sandstone, to complement the Mecca-facing mosque placed to the west of the main structure. Parchin kari, a method of decoration on a large scale-inlaid work of jewels and Jali work has been used to decorate the structure.

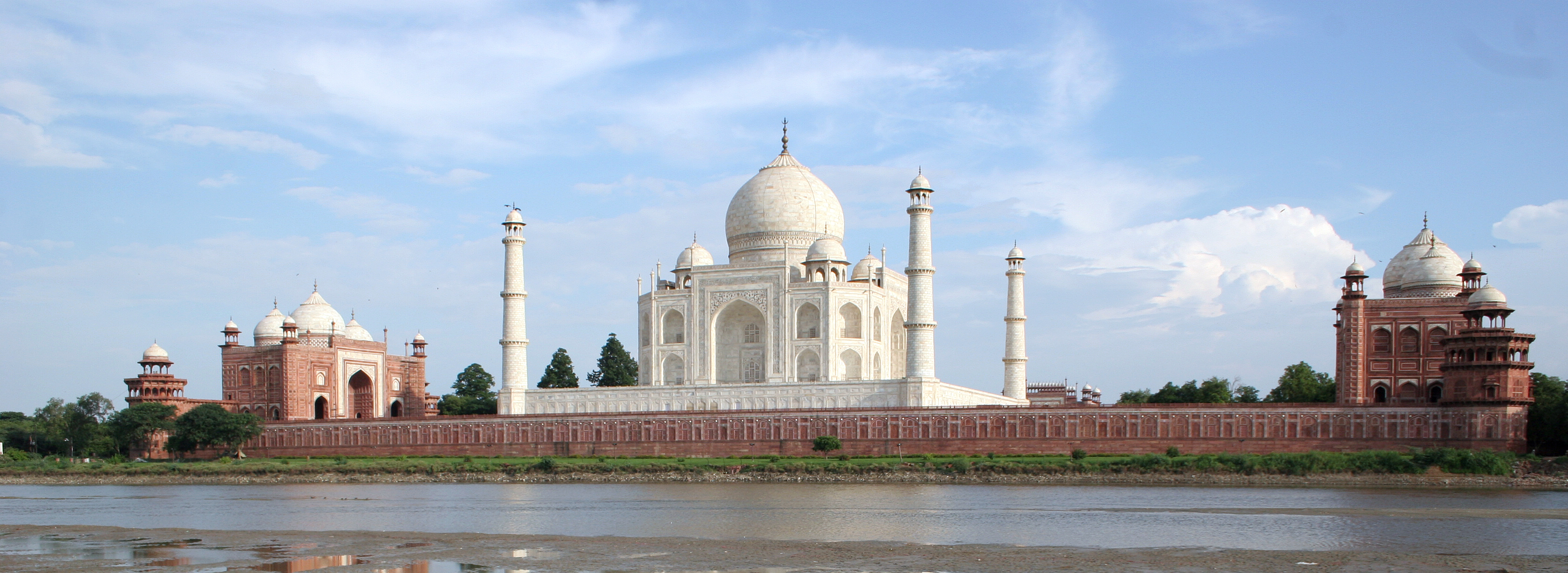
Taj Mahal and outlying buildings as seen from across the Yamuna River (northern view).

==== Wazir Khan Mosque and Hammam ====
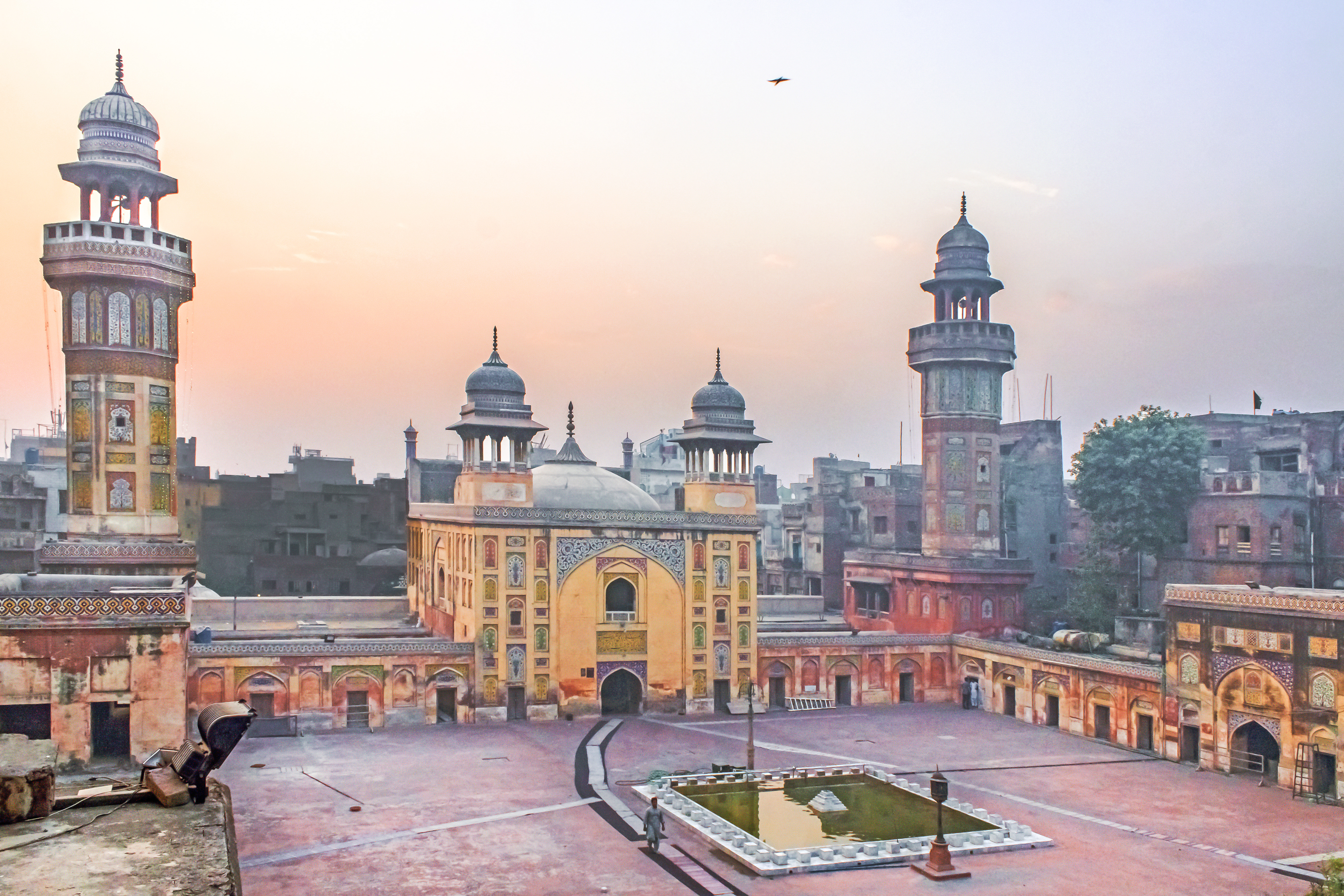
Wazir Khan Mosque in Lahore, Pakistan, is considered to be the most ornately decorated Mughal-era mosque

The Wazir Khan Mosque was commissioned by the royal physician Wazir Khan during the reign of the Mughal Emperor Shah Jahan in 1634, and completed in 1642. Considered to be the most ornately decorated Mughal-era mosque, It is well known for its intricate faience tile work known as kashi-kari, as well as its interior surfaces that are almost entirely embellished with elaborate Mughal-era frescoes. The mosque has been under extensive restoration since 2009 under the direction of the Aga Khan Trust for Culture and the Government of Punjab. Wazir Khan also commissioned the Shahi Hammam; the baths were built to serve as a waqf, or endowment, for the maintenance of the Wazir Khan Mosque.

==== Shah Jahan Mosque ====
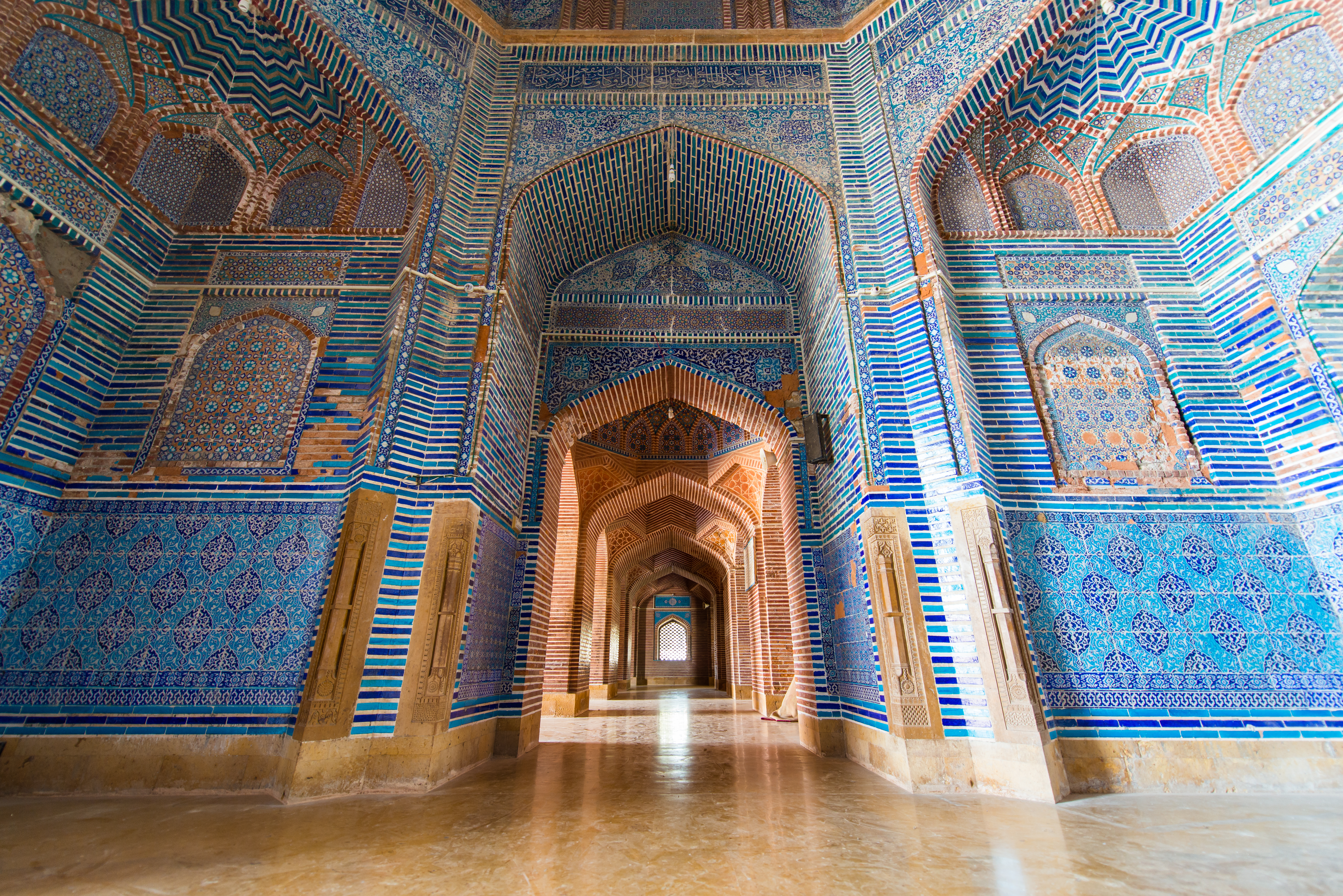
The Shah Jahan Mosque in Thatta. Its tilework exhibits Timurid influences introduced during Shah Jahan's campaigns in Central Asia.

The Shah Jahan Mosque is the jama masjid (congregational mosque) for the city of Thatta, in the Pakistani province of Sindh. The mosque commissioned by Shah Jahan, who bestowed it to the city as a token of gratitude. Its style is heavily influenced by Central Asian Timurid architecture, which was introduced after Shah Jahan's campaigns near Balkh and Samarkand. The mosque is considered to have the most elaborate display of tile work in South Asia, and is also notable for its geometric brick work, a decorative element that is unusual for Mughal-period mosques.

=== Aurangzeb ===
In Aurangzeb's reign (1658–1707) squared stone and marble was replaced by brick or rubble with stucco ornament. Srirangapatna and Lucknow have examples of later Indo-Mughal architecture. He made additions to the Lahore Fort and also commissioned one of the thirteen gates which were later named after him (Alamgir).

==== Badshahi Mosque ====
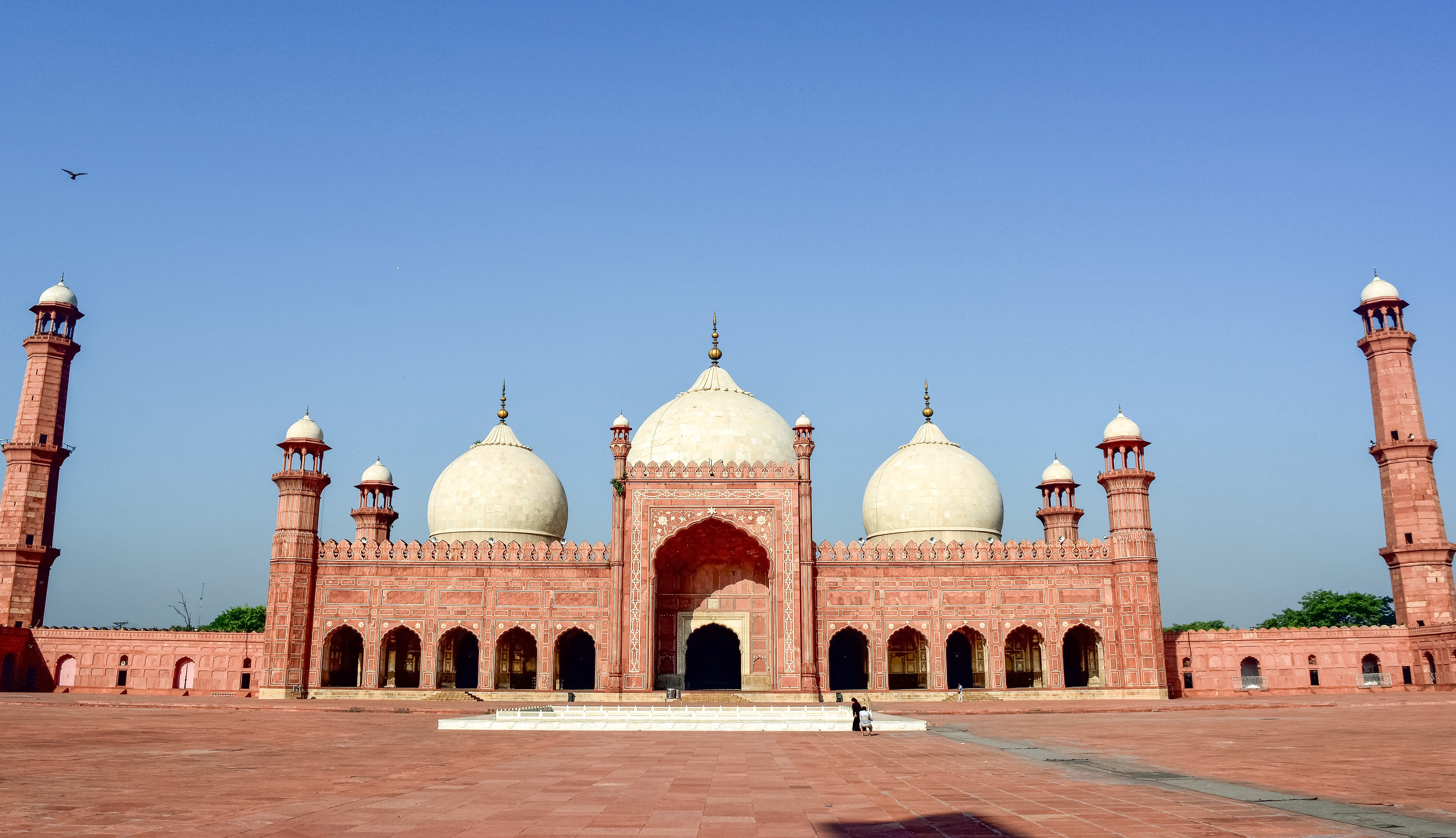
Badshahi Masjid, Lahore, Pakistan, the second-largest mosque in the Indian subcontinent

The Badshahi Mosque in Lahore, Pakistan, was commissioned by the sixth Mughal Emperor Aurangzeb. Constructed between 1673 and 1674, it is the largest Mughal mosque and the last of the imperial mosques to be built. The mosque is adjacent to the Lahore Fort and is the last in the series of congregational mosques in red sandstone. The red sandstone of the walls contrasts with the white marble of the domes and the subtle intarsia decoration. Aurangzeb's mosque's architectural plan is similar to that of his father, Shah Jahan, the Jama Masjid in Delhi; though it is much larger. It also functions as an idgah. The courtyard which spreads over 276,000 square feet, can accommodate one hundred thousand worshippers; ten thousand can be accommodated inside the mosque. The minarets are 196 feet (60 m) tall. The Mosque is one of the most famous Mughal structures but suffered greatly under the reign of Maharaja Ranjit Singh. In 1993, the Government of Pakistan included the Badshahi Mosque in the tentative list for UNESCO World Heritage Site.

==== Additional monuments ====
Additional monuments from this period are associated with women from Aurangzeb's imperial family. The construction of the elegant Zeenat-ul-Masajid in Daryaganj was overseen by Aurangzeb's second daughter Zinat-al-Nissa. Aurangzeb's sister Roshan-Ara who died in 1671. The tomb of Roshanara Begum and the garden surrounding it were neglected for a long time and are now in an advanced state of decay.

==== Bibi ka Maqbara ====
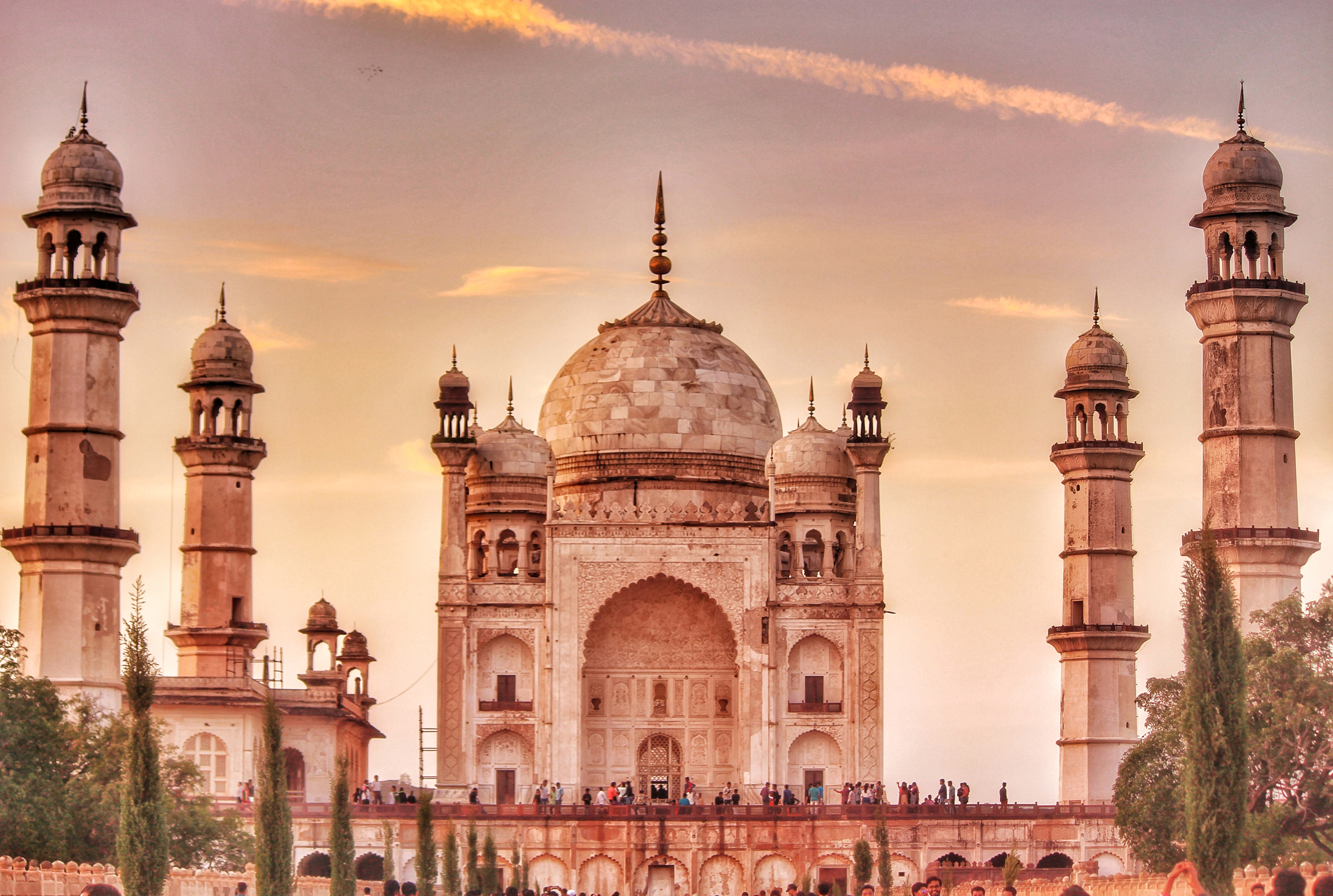
Bibi Ka Maqbara is a tomb in Aurangabad, Maharashtra, which was commissioned by Aurangzeb in the memory of his wife, Dilras Banu Begum

Bibi Ka Maqbara was a mausoleum commissioned by Emperor Aurangzeb, in the late 17th century as a loving tribute to his first wife, Dilras Bano Begum in Aurangabad, Maharashtra. Some accounts suggest that later it was taken care by Azam Shah, son of aurangzeb. It is a replica of the Taj Mahal, and was designed by Ata-Ullah, the son of Ahmed Lahori, who was the principal designer of the Taj Mahal.

=== Late Mughal ===
==== Lalbagh Fort ====
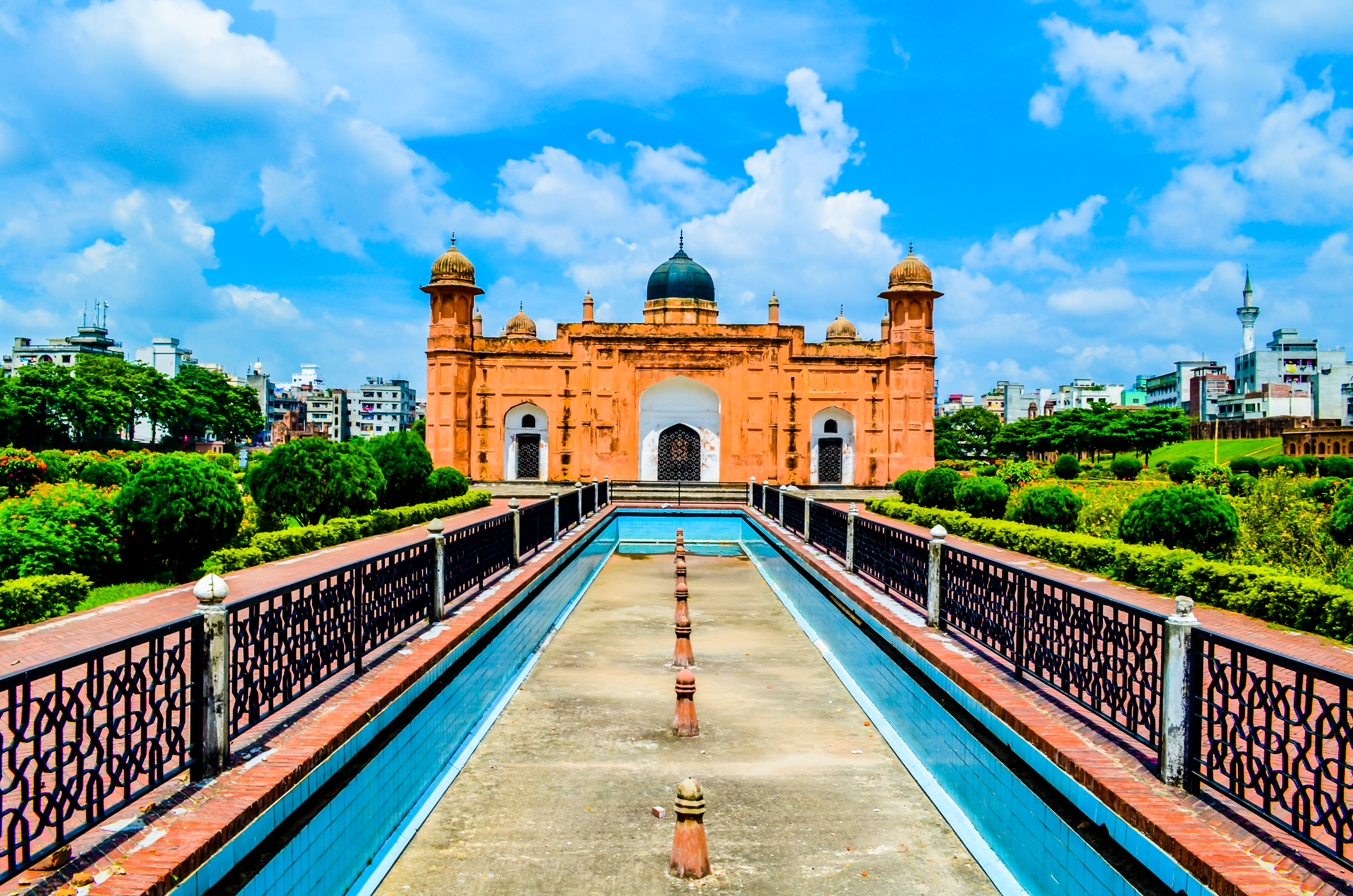
Lalbagh Fort in Dhaka, an incomplete fort commissioned by Azam Shah

Lalbagh Fort (also known as "Fort Aurangabad"), a Mughal palace fortress at the Buriganga River in the southwestern part of Dhaka, Bangladesh, whose construction started in 1678 during the reign of Aurangzeb's son Azam Shah.

==== Tomb of Safdar Jang ====
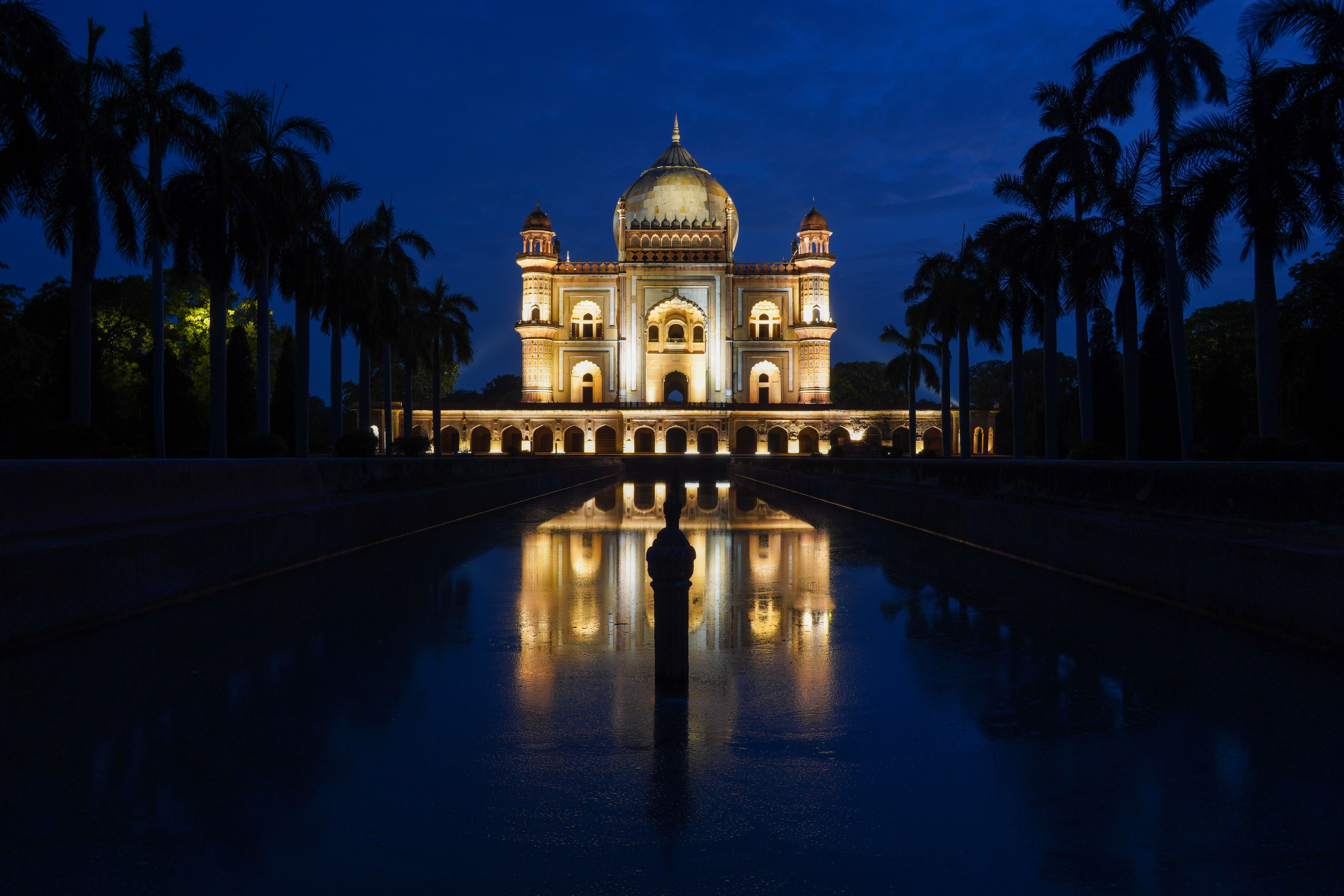
Tomb of Safdar Jung at night

The Tomb of Safdar Jung completed in 1754 is one of the last examples of Mughal Architecture.

== Gardens ==
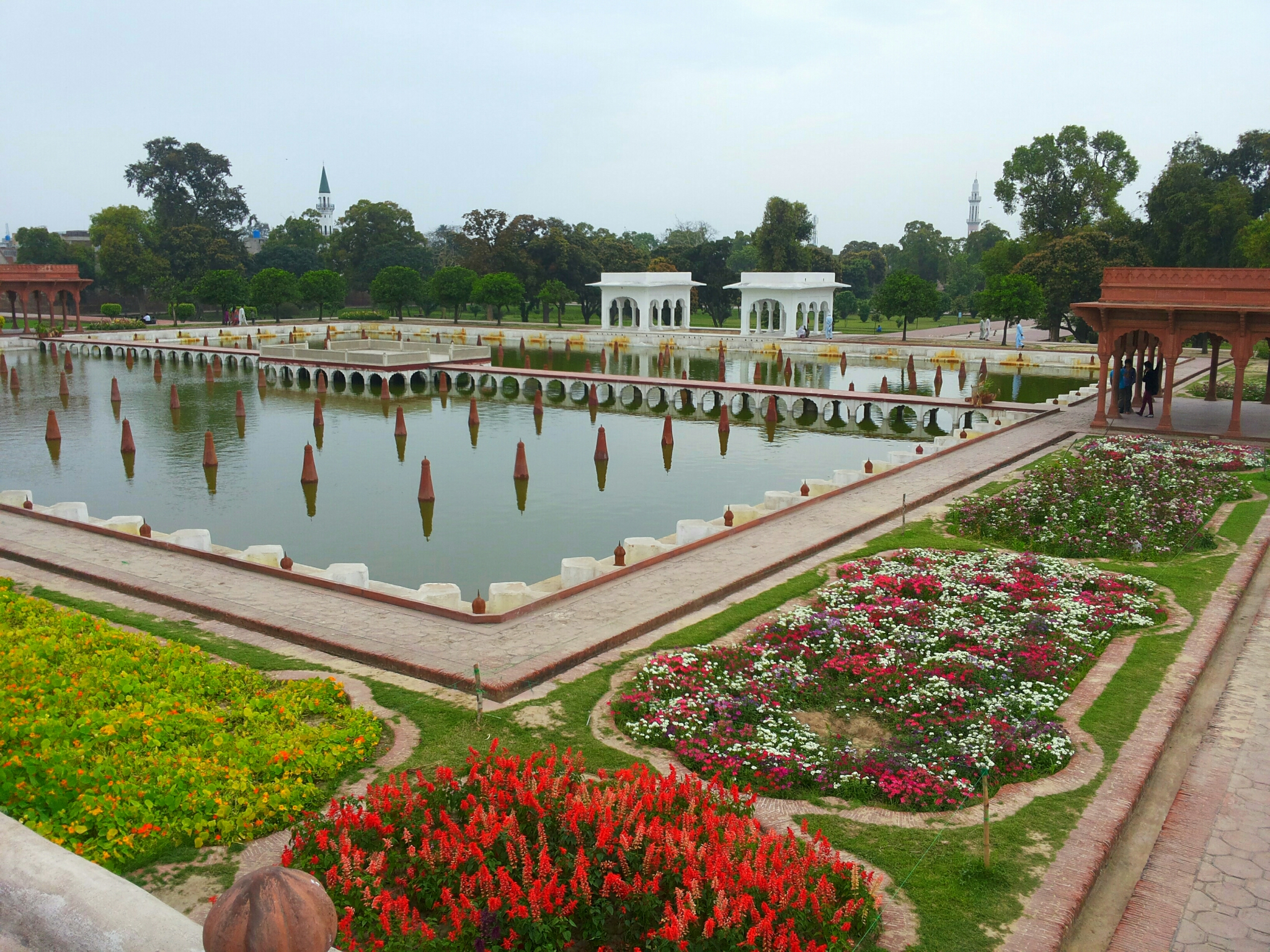
The Shalimar Gardens in Lahore are among the most famous Mughal gardens.

Mughal gardens were built by the Mughals in the Islamic style. This style was influenced by Persian gardens. They are built in the char bagh structure, which is a quadrilateral garden layout based on the four gardens of Paradise mentioned in the Qur'an. This style is intended to create a representation of an earthly utopia in which humans co-exist in perfect harmony with all elements of nature.

The quadrilateral garden is divided by walkways or flowing water into four smaller parts. Significant use of rectilinear layouts are made within the walled enclosures. Some of the typical features include pools, fountains and canals inside the gardens.

Some famous examples of Mughal gardens are the Bagh-e Babur at Kabul, Mehtab Bagh at the Taj Mahal, gardens at Humayun's Tomb, Shalimar Gardens at Lahore, Wah Gardens in Wah, Khusro Bagh at Allahabad, as well as Pinjore Gardens at Haryana.

The ensemble of six Mughal Gardens in Jammu and Kashmir (Pari Mahal, Nishat Bagh, Shalimar Bagh, Chashme Shahi, Verinag Garden, and Achabal Gardens) are on the tentative list of UNESCO World Heritage Sites in India.

=== Shalimar Gardens ===
It is a Mughal garden complex located in Lahore, capital of the Pakistani province of Punjab. The gardens date from the period when the Mughal Empire was at its artistic and aesthetic zenith. Construction of the gardens began in 1641 during the reign of Emperor Shah Jahan, and was completed in 1642. In 1981 the Shalimar Gardens were inscribed as a UNESCO World Heritage Site as they embody Mughal garden design at the apogee of its development.

== Ice house ==
The Mughal emperors adapted Persian's Yakchal during their ruled.

Humayun (r. 1530–1540, 1555–1556) expanded ice imports from Kashmir to Delhi and Agra, insulating blocks with straw and saltpetre to slow melting, a Persian technique. Early Baraf Khana (underground pits) stored ice, adapted from 'yakhchāl' for preservation.

Akbar (r. 1556–1605) organized ice transport from Kashmir to Delhi, Agra, and Lahore via a 14-stage relay system, delivering ice in two days using saltpetre. The ab-dar khana at Fatehpur Sikri used sandstone cisterns and qanats, resembling yakhchāl, to cool water and make sherbets and early desserts.

During the era of Jahangir (r. 1605–1627), Tuzuk-i-Jahangiri describes baraf khana as insulated cellars storing ice for palace cooling, food preservation, and kulfi, a frozen milk dessert with pistachios and saffron. Ice was harvested in Lahore from shallow ice pans and stored in straw-lined pits.

Shah Jahan (r. 1628–1658) commissioned a baraf khana in Sirmaur to supply Agra and Delhi's Red Fort. These underground structures with thick walls stored ice for drinks, food, and kulfi, symbolizing imperial luxury.

== Influence ==
Mughal architecture has also influenced later Indian architectural styles, including the Indo-Saracenic style of the British Raj, the Rajput style and the Sikh style. One scholar has also noted similarities between Mughal architecture and architectural projects within the Ethiopian Empire in the early 17th century, primarily those sponsored by Susenyos I and carried out with the help of the Jesuit missionaries that he patronized. This influence was likely due to the strong connections between the Jesuit missions in Ethiopia and Mughal India at the time. Indian craftsmen, possibly with experience in Mughal constructions, are also reported to have worked on the projects.

Several mosques in Malaysia, such as the Kapitan Keling Mosque, Jamek Mosque, and Zahir Mosque, were influenced by Mughal architecture in their designs. In Brunei, the Omar Ali Saifuddien Mosque also incorporates Mughal influences.

== See also ==
- Indo-Islamic architecture
- Indo-Persian culture

== Sources ==
- Asher, Catherine Blanshard (1992). Architecture of Mughal India. The New Cambridge History of India, Part I. Vol. 4. Cambridge University Press. ISBN 9780521267281.
- Bloom, Jonathan M.; Blair, Sheila (2009). The Grove Encyclopedia of Islamic Art & Architecture. Oxford University Press. ISBN 978-0-19-530991-1.
- George Michell, Amit Pasricha (2011). Mughal Architecture & Gardens. Antique Collectors' Club. ISBN 9781851496709.
- Gupta, Subhadra Sen; Irani, Prakash (2013). Fathepur Sikri: Akbar's Magnificent City on a Hill. Niyogi Books. ISBN 9789381523728.
- Martínez d'Alòs-Moner, Andreu (2017). "The Infrastructure of the Mission: Convents, Palaces, and Temples". In Andreu Martínez d’Alòs-Moner, Victor; De Torres, Jorge; Martínez d'Alòs-Moner, Andreu; Cañete, Carlos (eds.). The Archaeology of the Jesuit Missions in Ethiopia (1557–1632). Brill. ISBN 9789004324695.
- Sinopoli, Carla M. (1994). "Monumentality and Mobility in Mughal Capitals". Asian Perspectives. 33 (2): 293–308. ISSN 0066-8435.
