= Achabal Gardens =

Mughal garden in Anantnag, India

- Location in Jammu and Kashmir Achabal Gardens (India)
- 33.6831°N 75.2222°E
- Type: Mughal Gardens
- Cultures: Mughal Empire
- Location: Achabal, Anantnag district, India
- Region: Asia

History
- Built: 1620; 406 years ago
- Built by: Nur Jahan

Site notes
- Length: 142 metres (466 ft)
- Width: 14 metres (46 ft)
- Area: 1,952.4 square metres (21,015 sq ft)
- Condition: Rebuilt
- Public access: Public garden

Achabal Gardens, "the places of the princes", is a small Mughal garden located at the southeastern end of the Kashmir Valley in the town of Achabal, Anantnag district, India. The town is located near the Himalayan Mountains.

== Background ==
The garden was built around 1620 A.D. by Mughal Empire Emperor Jahangir's wife, Nur Jahan. It was remodeled by Jahanara, who was the daughter of Shah Jahan around 1634-1640 A.D. The garden was rebuilt, following decay, on a smaller scale by Gulab Singh and it is now a public garden.

A main feature of the garden is a waterfall that enters into a pool of water. This place is also noted for its spring, which is said to be the re-appearance of a portion of the river Bringhi, whose waters suddenly disappear through a large fissure underneath a hill at the village Wani Divalgam in the Brang Pargana. It is said that in order to test this, a quantity of chaff was thrown in the Bringhi river at a place its water disappears at Wani Divalgam and that chaff came out of the Achabal spring. The water of the spring issues from several places near the foot of a low spur which is densely covered with deodar trees and at one place it gushes out from an oblique fissure large enough to admit a man's body and forms a volume some 46 centimetres (18 in) high and about 30 centimetres (12 in) in diameter.

== Gallery ==
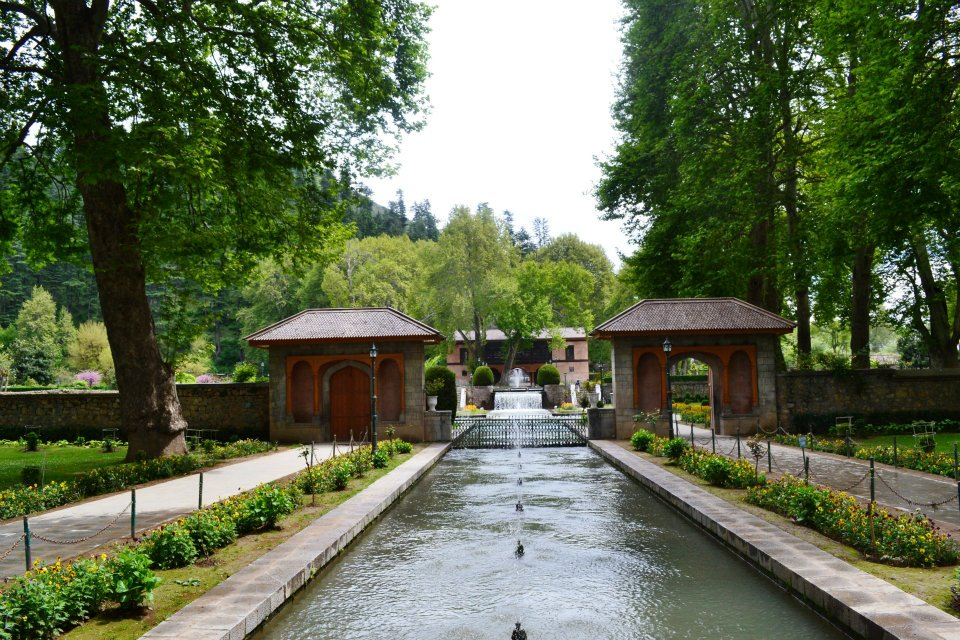
Mughal Gardens at Achabal

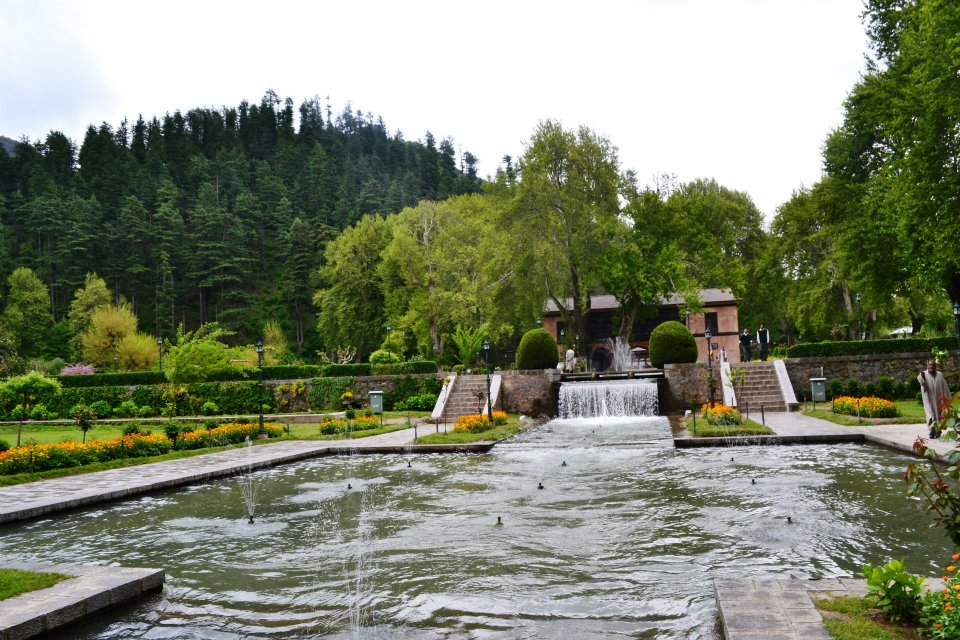
Inside Mughal Gardens at Achabal
