= Hakura Badas Gam =

Village in Anantnag, Jammu & Kashmir

Hakura Badas Gam Hakur Badas Gam
- Location in Jammu and Kashmir, India Hakura Badas Gam (India)
- Coordinates: 33.6503°N 75.2359°E
- Country: India
- Union territory: Jammu and Kashmir
- District: Anantnag
- Elevation: 1,787 m (5,863 ft)

Population (2011)
  - City: 9,088
  - Rural: 100%
  - Literacy rate: 55.40
  - Sex ratio: 974
- Time zone: UTC+5:30 (IST)
- Postal code: 192211
- Vehicle registration: JK03
- Website: www.anantnag.nic.in

Hakura Badas Gam is a large village in Tehsil Dooru of Anantnag district, in Jammu and Kashmir. It is bifurcated into two parts viz Badasgam "A" and Badasgam "B" by a stream called as Bringi River (Astaan Koll).

Badasgam has a shrine of Sufi saint Sultan Sahab where thousands of devotees from across the valley visit every year to pay homage and respect to the shrine of saint.

Hakura Badas Gam has a population of 9,088 spread over 1,150 households.
