= Achabal =

Achabal Achival
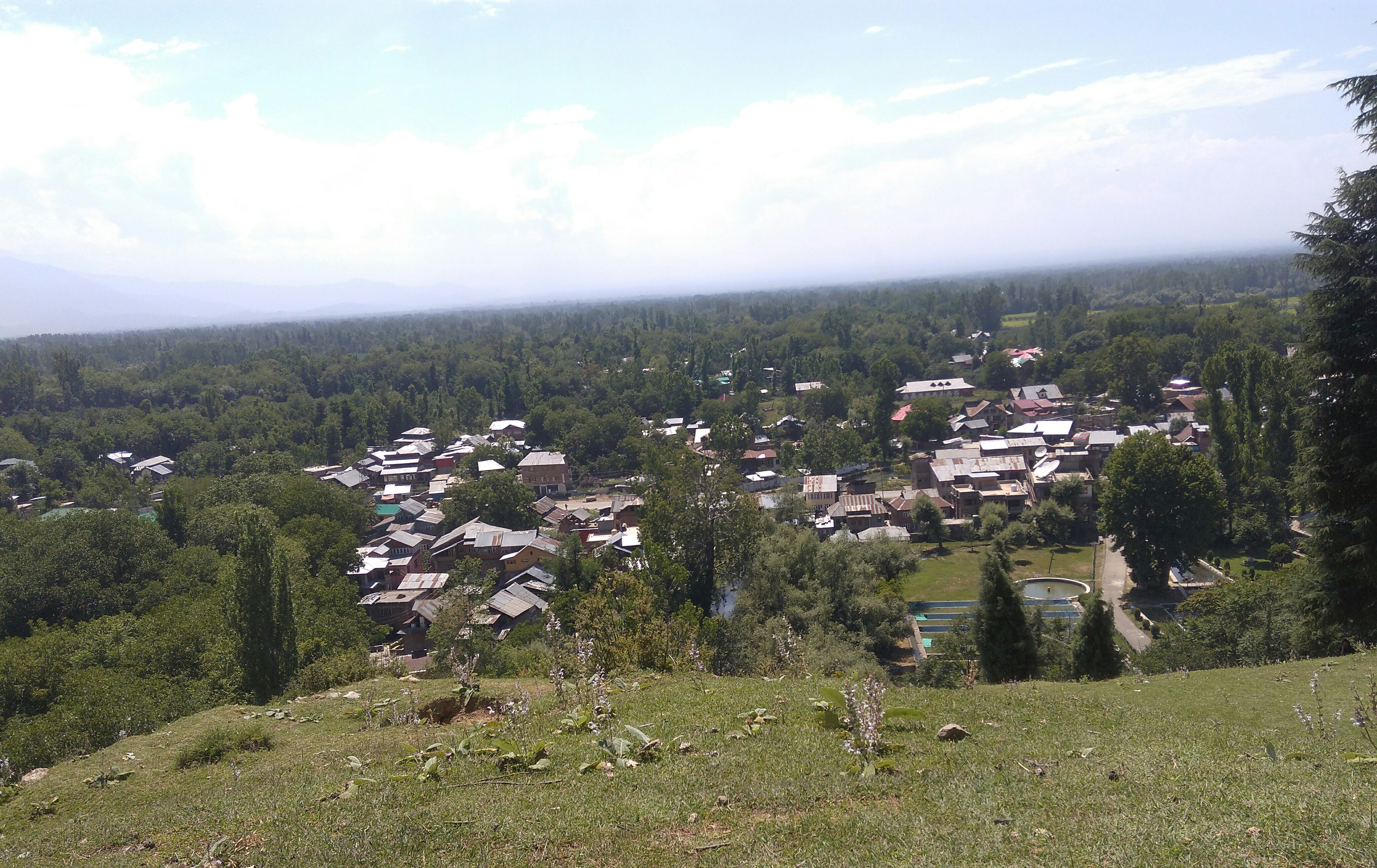
- Achabal Town

- Location in Jammu and Kashmir, India Achabal (India)
- Coordinates: 33.68°N 75.23°E
- Country: Jammu & Kashmir
- Union territory: Jammu and Kashmir
- District: Anantnag
- Elevation: 1,936 m (6,352 ft)

Population (2001)
  - Total: 5,835

Languages
  - Official: Kashmiri, Urdu, Hindi, Dogri, English
- Time zone: UTC+5:30 (IST)
- Postal code: 192201
- Vehicle registration: JK03

Achabal (Urdu pronunciation: [ət͡ʃʰəbəl]), also known as Achival (Kashmiri pronunciation: [at͡ʃʰiʋal]) in Kashmiri, is a town in Anantnag district, in the union territory of Jammu and Kashmir, India.

Achabal is an important tourist town about 8.1km away from Anantnag, and is notable for a Mughal garden called Achabal Gardens, holding an ancient spring surrounded by a terraced landscape developed by the Mughals. The upper portion of the garden is called 'Bag-e-Begum Abad' developed by Malika Noor Jehan Begum in 1616 AD and renowned as Sahib Abad in which there is a Hamam (treasure of water) getting heat from a logical lamp (Tosnag).

Cascades and fountains have been erected by Mughal Emperors. A mosque standing in the garden is believed to have been constructed by Mughal Prince Dara Shikoh. Achabal was once the pleasure retreat of Empress Nur Jahan. A trout hatchery is also located nearby.

== Geography ==
Achabal is located at 33.68°N 75.23°E. It has an average elevation of 1936 metres (6352 feet) above mean sea level.

== History ==
According to Kalhana's Rajatarangini Achabal (Sanskrit Akṣavāla) was founded by Aksha, son of King Nara II of the Gonanditya dynasty.

== Demographics ==
At the 2001 India census, Achabal had a population of 5835. Males constituted 53% of the population and females 47%. Achabal had an average literacy rate of 65%, higher than the national average of 59.5%; with 65% of the males and 35% of females literate. 12% of the population was under 6 years of age.

== Nearest tehsils ==
- Shangus
- Anantnag
- Kokernag
