= Spring offensive =

Spring offensive may refer to:

== Military ==
- Spring Campaign (1849), an offensive of the Hungarian War of Independence
- German spring offensive, Ludendorff's 1918 offensive of World War I
- Spring offensive of the White Army, a 1919 offensive during the Russian Civil War
- Italian spring offensive, part of the Greco-Italian War in 1941
- Spring 1945 offensive in Italy, an Allied offensive in World War II
- Chinese spring offensive, a Chinese offensive in 1951 during the Korean War
- Easter Offensive, a spring 1972 North Vietnamese offensive during the Vietnam War
- 1975 spring offensive, a North Vietnamese offensive during the Vietnam War
- Spring offensive (various), the Taliban term used for the annual restart of fighting after the end of winter during the War in Afghanistan

== Other uses ==
- Spring Offensive (poem), a poem by Wilfred Owen about World War I
- Spring Offensive Volume 1: Nuclear Winter Remixes, a 2010 album by Sole
- Spring Offensive, a British indie rock band

== See also ==
- Summer Offensive (disambiguation)
- Winter Offensive (disambiguation)
