= Madrassas in Pakistan =

Islamic religious education

Madrassas of Pakistan are Islamic seminaries in Pakistan, known in Urdu as Madaris-e-Deeniya (literally: religious schools). Most madrassas teach mostly Islamic subjects such as tafseer (interpretation of the Quran), hadith (thousands of sayings of Muhammad), fiqh (Islamic law) and Arabic (the language of the Quran); but include some non-Islamic subjects (such as logic, philosophy, mathematics), which enable students to understand the religious ones. The number of madrassas grew dramatically during and since the rule of General Muhammad Zia-ul-Haq. They are especially popular among Pakistan's poorest families, in part because they feed and house their students. Estimates of the number of madrasas vary between 12,000 and 40,000. Officially, the country's first economic survey found out that at the time of the 2023 census there were 36,331 madrassas in Pakistan. In some areas of Pakistan they outnumber the underfunded public schools.

Most madrassas in Pakistan are Sunni, follow the doctrine of the Deobandi strand and have educated the masses about the essentials and principles of their sectarian version of Islam, throughout Pakistan. An estimated 4–10 per cent of madrassas serve the minority Shia population. Additionally there are a number of Quran academies offering diplomas in Islamic courses.

== History ==
The madaris rose as colleges of learning in the Islamic world in the 11th century, though there were institutions of learning earlier. They catered not only to the religious establishment, though that was the dominant influence over them, but also the secular one. To the latter they supplied physicians, administrative officials, judges and teachers.

Conditions in madrassas were "regularly condemned by human rights agencies" as "crowded and undisciplined" according to Gilles Kepel. A 1996 report of the Human Rights Commission of Pakistan, for example, complained of students being held "in chains".

After the September 11, 2001 attacks on the United States, American television commentators widely associated madrassas with violence or fundamentalism. Former Pakistani president Gen. Musharraf tried to introduce an element of nominal control as an overture to American pressure, which have by and large been considered a failure.

=== Growth of Madrassas ===
Estimates of the numbers of madrassas vary, but all agree their number has grown enormously, having expanded greatly during and after the rule of President General Zia-ul-Haq (1977–1988), who initially funded Deobandi madrassas with funds from his compulsory zakat collection which began in 1980. Another benefactor was Saudi Arabia who, starting in the mid-1980s, sought to counteract help the Islamist Islamic Republic of Iran was giving to the assertive Shia minority in Pakistan, with "substantial funds" to expand conservative Sunni madrassas.

According to The News International, in 1947 there were only 189 madrassas in Pakistan but "over 40,000" by 2008. According to David Commins book, The Wahhabi Mission and Saudi Arabia, their number grew from around 900 in 1971 to over 8,000 official ones and another 25,000 unofficial ones in 1988. In 2002 the country had 10,000-13,000 unregistered madrassas with an estimated 1.7 to 1.9 million students, according to Christopher Candland. In some areas of Pakistan they outnumbered the underfunded public schools.

According to a 2009 report by The New York Times, there were over 12,000 registered madrasas in the country, with nearly half located in Punjab—southern Punjab having one of the highest concentrations. There were reportedly more unregistered Madrassas as well. Although madrasas accounted for only about 7 percent of primary schools at the time, their influence was significantly magnified by the shortcomings of the state education system and the deeply rooted religiosity of rural areas. An effort in 2005 to register these institutions faced resistance, with 20 percent of areas in Punjab refusing to comply. According to Punjab police, more than two-thirds of the province’s suicide bombers had studied at madrasas.

In 2013, according to a departmental official who spoke to Dawn News on the condition of anonymity, approximately 2,500 madrassas are registered with the Balochistan government, while the number of unregistered seminaries exceeds 10,000.

As of 2015, there were 35,337 registered and 8,249 unregistered madrassas across Pakistan. Out of these, there were 4,135 unregistered madrassas in Khyber Pakhtunkhwa, 2,411 in Punjab, 1,406 in Sindh, 266 in Balochistan, and 31 in Islamabad.

In 2016, Sindh authorities reported the identification of more than 10,000 so called "ghost madrassas" in the province after physical verification found that many registered institutions did not exist, a finding that emerged when 7,724 functioning madrassas were geo tagged during an official review process. These madrassas generated funds through bus collections, Eid animal hides, visits to business owners, and donation boxes, and were promoted as mosque extensions using banners, bank accounts, and online platforms. Some operated through registered NGOs to protect revenue and avoid taxes, and investigations suggested that fundraisers were sometimes involved in money laundering.

In 2020, there were more than 22,000 registered madrassas, with many more unregistered, teaching more than 2 million children.

By 2022, Islamabad police reported that the capital had 562 madrassas, nearly 250 of which were unregistered despite government requirements, and authorities said enforcement action had been limited due to concerns over potential backlash from Islamic hardliners, citing past violence and threats linked to state actions involving religious institutions.

=== Post 9/11 oversight ===
After the September 11, 2001 attacks on the United States, the US government encouraged former Pakistani president Gen. Musharraf to do something about Madrassas. Musharraf tried to introduce an element of nominal control. Two laws were passed: one to create state-controlled madrassas (model: Dini Madaris, 2001); the other to register and control them (2002). The first had moderate success, as some religious institutions registered in 2003 with the Pakistan Madrasah Education Board created by this law. However, the three alternative institutions it created suffer from organizational difficulties. The second measure proved unpopular with the madrassas, but the government has restricted some access of foreign students to the madaris education system.

Madrassas in Pakistan have been used to recruit jihadists and as a pretext to finance militancy as has been mentioned in the 9/11 Commission Report. For example, officials with the Lashkar-e-Taiba's charity wing, Jamaat-ud-Dawa, travelled to Saudi Arabia seeking donations for new schools, vastly inflating the schools costs to the donors – then siphoned off the excess money to fund militant operations.

=== Regulation and FATF compliance ===
Between 2018 and 2022, the Financial Action Task Force (FATF) placed Pakistan on its grey list. As a condition for removal from the list, the FATF required the Pakistani government to bring religious seminaries under state oversight to ensure financial transparency. In 2019, the PTI government under Prime Minister Imran Khan reclassified seminaries as educational institutions and placed them under the Ministry of Education. The Directorate General of Religious Education (DGRE) was created for this purpose. However, between August 2019 and January 2021, only 1,957 registration forms had been disseminated. While 295 were submitted with the DGRE, only 140 seminaries had been registered at that point. By 2025, over 17,500 madrasas were registered with the Ministry of Education, which enrolled 2.2 million students. However, many seminaries, particularly those affiliated with Islamist parties and including some large and prominent institutions, resisted integration into the formal system.

In January 2021, clerics and seminary students protested in Islamabad against the Islamabad Capital Territory Waqf Properties Act, 2020. The protests were led by Tehreek-i-Tahaffuz-i-Masajid-o-Madaris Islamabad, which declared the Act unislamic and alleged it undermined the ideological character of the country. Protesters refused to register seminaries.

In 2022, Jaish-e-Mohammed expanded its Bahawalpur seminary by extending into newly acquired adjoining land, purchased earlier that year by Abdul Rauf Ashgar, who had been designated a terrorist by the United States in 2010.

==== Societies Registration (Amendment) Bill 2024 ====
In 2024, a controversy arose over madrassa registration after the government passed Societies Registration (Amendment) Bill 2024, which would shift control of seminaries from the education department to deputy commissioners as was before 2019. President Asif Ali Zardari initially returned the bill, citing legal flaws, risks of sectarianism, and potential international repercussions, including FATF and EU's GSP+ sanctions. The Jamiat Ulema-e-Islam (F) pressed for assent, while government ministers and the Council of Islamic Ideology opposed the rollback, emphasizing the 2019 mainstreaming of seminaries. After negotiations, the president signed the bill into law, requiring all madrassas to register under the Societies Act, with existing unregistered seminaries given six months, with an ordinance allowing Islamabad madrassas to register with either the education or industries ministry.

== Curriculum ==
No one thought to ask about what would happen next ... nearly an entire generation came of age in a peculiar all-male world where the only concern was the Koran, sharia law and the glorification of jihad

— Dina Temple-Raston, 2007

Most madrasas teach mostly Islamic subjects such as memorization of the Quran, Tafseer (Interpretation of the Quran), Hadith (thousands of sayings of Muhammad), usul ul hadith (rules of hadith), Fiqh and Usul ul fiqh (Islamic jurisprudence and principles of Islamic jurisprudence), Sarf and Nahw (branches of Arabic grammar), Arabic language, Islamic finance, Mantiq (logic), philosophy, classic Arabic literature and eloquence. Mastery of these subjects qualifies a student to become an Islamic scholar or cleric (maulvi or maulana).

In terms of religious doctrine, many of the madrasas are funded by Saudis groups and combine Deobandi ideology with "Wahhabism as reflected in the education imparted to students in Saudi Arabia government." Critics complain on intolerance in teachings as reflected in the line that "Muslim pupils in radical madrassas chant at the morning assembly: 'When people deny our faith, ask them to convert and if they don't destroy them utterly.'" Other Saudi madrassas, particularly schools in Afghan refugee camps, may provide an interpretation of Islam that "blends Pushtun ideals and Deobandi views, precisely the hallmark of the Taliban." The vast expansion of madrasas during the 1980s meant a shortage of qualified teachers such that "quite a few teachers did not discern between tribal values of their ethnic group, the Pushtuns and the religious ideals."

Madrassas teach Arabic and while there are over 70 languages in Pakistan, few Pakistanis speak Arabic. The Economist found that of the children who complete five years of primary school, only half are literate.

== Comparative studies ==
In addition to the South Asian Dars-i-Nizami curriculum, the students read books in Urdu as part of comparative religion or training in the beliefs of the sub-sect (maslak). These texts are taught in a manner in order to promote understanding of differences and similarities as they exist, with the stated goal of respect for human diversity. Subjects such as Western ideologies — capitalism, individualism, freedom, feminism, socialism, democracy, human rights are discussed in the context of how they relate to the Muslim thought and identity prevalent in the schools.

== Famous Pakistan Madrassas ==
- Jamia Faridia, Islamabad
- Jamia Binori Town, Karachi
- Darul 'Uloom Karachi, Karachi
- Darul Uloom Haqqania, Khyber Pakhtunkhwa
- Jamia-tur-Rasheed, Karachi
- Jamia Al-Kauthar, Islamabad
- Jamia Muhammadia, Islamabad
- Jamia islamia, Mirpur, Azad Kashmir
- Jamia imdadia, Faisalabad
- Jamia Naeemia, Lahore
- Jamia Ashrafia, Lahore
- Jamia SALFIA, Faisalabad.

== Importance ==
=== Social bonding and obedience ===
Providing free room and board to impoverished students, and shelter from the privations of poverty, the primarily Deobandi madrassas had a powerful esprit de corps. After many years in "conditions of intense intimacy" with little or no contact with the outside world, Madrassa students tended to be "extremely devoted" to their teachers. The strict doctrinaire teaching based on memorization discouraged even "the smallest expression of free thought or individual will", and gave root to fanaticism and a willingness to fight "anyone designated" an unbeliever by the master—whether a Shiite neighbor, Indian soldiers, even other Sunni Muslims.

=== Social mobility ===
The madrassas have been called "the only realistic option" for the majority of Pakistani families to provide education for their sons. Another source (Sadakat Kadri) has stated that "absent an educational Marshall Plan, the hope of educating a literate breadwinner is about as bright a future as millions of families will ever get," and that the schools offer "shelter from the social storm ... camaraderie instead of chaos," for lower middle class Pakistanis. In some areas of Pakistan they outnumber the underfunded public schools. Within Pakistan, there has been a relative jump in their numbers over the past two decades. The primary concern with the explosion of the madrassa system is not the schools in general, but the implications for radicalized minorities in them. These schools have become the new breeding ground for radical Islamic terrorists, where the next generation is trained and groomed.

=== Jihadi recruitment ===
Indoctrinated children at a Taliban-affiliated madrassa in Pakistan undergoing training in firearms, as pictured in 2009.

A 2008 US diplomatic cable expressed alarm that Saudi Arabian-financed madrassas were fostering "religious radicalism" in "previously moderate regions of Pakistan" as children from impoverished families were sent to isolated madrassas, and once there often recruited for "martyrdom operations".

“Graduates” of the madrassas are supposedly either retained as teachers for the next generation of recruits, or are sent to a sort-of postgraduate school for jihadi training. “Teachers at the madrassa appear to make the decision,” of where the students go next, “based on their read of the child’s willingness to engage in violence and acceptance of jihadi culture versus his utility as an effective proponent of Deobandi or Ahl-e-Hadith ideology/recruiter.”

The spring break for Pakistani Madrassas is one of the key factors in the beginning of the annual Afghanistan fighting season.

=== All-female madrassas ===
There are almost 2,000 registered Islamic religious schools for girls, educating almost a quarter of a million young women and providing more than half of the candidates sitting graduate-level exams every year. However, radicalism is an issue. Dr. Masooda Bano of Economic and Social Research Council has said that lower middle class parents often send daughters aged 16 to 20 to madrassas as an alternative to a shrinking male oriented job market and to regulate social interaction before marriage. She has argued that female madrassas offer economic and social opportunities while reflecting the tension between traditional values and global influences that can further radicalise conservative beliefs.

=== Influence ===
The tens of thousands of pupils and graduates of Deobandi madrassas gave that school of Islam the ability to "intervene directly" in Pakistani political life and "to contest everything that appeared to compromise their view of the Islamic world order," according to political scientist Gilles Kepel.

== Oversight bodies ==
=== Federations ===
Ittehad-e-Tanzeemat-Madaris Pakistan is a federation of the five waqfs (seminary boards) in Pakistan, representing the different schools of Islam – AhleSunnat Wal Jamaat Deoband, AhleSunnat Barelwi, Ahl-e Hadith, Shia and Jamaat-e-Islami. Muhammad Muneeb ur Rehman is the president of Ittehad Tanzimat Madaris-e-Deeniya Pakistan.

=== Government ===
The Directorate General of Religious Education (DGRE) is a governmental body established in 2019 to regulate and mainstream religious seminaries. The DGRE was set up as a significant step towards integrating religious seminaries into the mainstream education system. It facilitates the registration of seminaries and operates as a facilitation center for them. With its head office in Islamabad, the DGRE has 16 regional offices across the country. It has registered around 5,000 seminaries nationwide, aiming to create equal opportunities for all students and bridge the gap between religious and modern education.

== See also ==
- Directorate General of Religious Education
- Blasphemy in Pakistan
- Education in Pakistan
- Freedom of religion in Pakistan
- International propagation of Salafism and Wahhabism by region § Pakistan
- Islam in Pakistan
- Islamic schools and branches
- Islamization in Pakistan
- Pakistani textbooks controversy
- Sectarian violence in Pakistan
