= Abdul Qadir Azad =

Abdul Qadir Azad (1939–2003) was the Grand Imam of the historic Badshahi Mosque, the central mosque of Lahore in Pakistan, from 1972 until his death in 2003. He was succeeded by his son Abdul Khabeer Azad as the Grand Imam.

== Tenure ==
Azad was appointed imam of Badshahi Mosque in 1972. At the time of 2nd Islamic Summit in February 1974, he led the Friday prayer at Badshahi Mosque which was attended by thirty-nine leaders of Muslim countries. Azad was known for his support of inter-religious dialogue and promotion of harmony with other religions. He was one of the speakers at the seminar arranged by World Minorities Alliance in 1980 for Muslim-Christian dialogue.

Azad died on 15 January 2003 at Lahore, and was paid tribute to by several Catholic, Sikh and Muslim religious leaders.
