= Summer Offensive =

Summer Offensive or Summer Campaign may refer to:

- Summer Campaign (1849), during the Hungarian Revolution
- Kerensky offensive, 1917
- Greek Summer Offensive, 1920
- Irish Free State offensive, 1922
- Case Blue, the German summer offensive of 1942
- Summer Offensive of 1947 in Northeast China
- 1993 Summer Offensives
- KLA Summer offensive (1998)
- Yugoslav counter-offensive in Kosovo (1998), known as the “Great Summer offensive” in Serb media
- 2021 Taliban offensive
- 2023 Ukrainian counteroffensive
- Summer Offensive (comics), a 1993 event in the 2000 AD comics

== See also ==
- Spring Offensive (disambiguation)
- Winter Offensive (disambiguation)
