= Ruet-e-Hilal Committee =

Pakistani government department

Central Ruet-e-Hilal Committee
- مرکزی رویتِ ہلال کمیٹی; Markazi Ruet-e-Hilal Committee
- Established: 1974; 52 years ago
- Type: Government agency
- Headquarters: Karachi, Sindh, Pakistan
- Ministry Head: Sardar Muhammad Yousuf
- Chairman: Abdul Khabeer Azad
- Parent organization: Ministry of Religious Affairs and Inter-faith Harmony (Pakistan)

The Central Ruet-e-Hilal Committee (Urdu: مرکزی رویتِ ہلال کمیٹی) is the official body in Pakistan responsible for announcing the sighting of the new moon, which determines the Islamic calendar. Currently chaired by Maulana Abdul Khabir Azad, the committee is supported by 150 observatories from the Pakistan Meteorological Department.

Established in 1974 through a resolution passed by the National Assembly of Pakistan, the committee's operations still lack formalised rules and regulations.

== Information about Moon ==
People who has sighted the Moon by themselves, can convey the information about the position of the Moon to the Ruet-e-Hilal Committee or Pakistan Meteorological department, on their phone numbers. The phone numbers for given information about the new moon sighting in Pakistan, by the public can be given on these phone numbers mentioned in the pictures.

== Chairmen ==
- Maulana Abdullah Ghazi (1975-1998)
- Mufti Ather Naeemi (1998-2006)
- Mufti Muneeb-ur-Rehman (2006-2020)
- Abdul Khabeer Azad (2020-present)

== Controversy ==
=== Historical controversies over Moon sighting ===
Controversies over Moon sighting have noted been in Muslim history since the Middle Ages. Al Majmu, a treatise written by the 13th century Arab scholar Muhyi ad-Din Yahya al-Nawawi, shows the founders of various Islamic schools of jurisprudence, including Imam Shafi and Imam Ahmad bin Hanbal, respectively from the eighth and ninth centuries, to have expressed different opinions on the issue. Shafi put his entire trust in arithmetic and astronomical calculations; Hanbal deemed the physical sighting of the Moon mandatory, although he did not see local sighting as necessary — once the Moon is sighted anywhere in the Muslim world, every follower of the faith must accept that. Ibn-e-Taymiyya, another 13th-century scholar, writing in his Risala fi’l-Hilal (Tract on the Crescent), “...categorically rejects the use of astronomical calculation in determining the lunar month.” Yaqut ibn Abdullah al-Hamawi, a 12th-century Arab biographer and geographer of Greek origin, gives the government complete authority in making such decisions. He cites a legal maxim: “Hukm al-hakim ilzamun wa yarfa’ al-khilaf” (decision by a ruler is decisive and erases differences). In the 1920s, the grand mufti at Jamia al-Azhar in Cairo, Shaykh Mustafa Maraghi wrote in a paper that personal testimony of Moon sighting cannot be accepted if scientific calculations conclusively prove that a Moon sighting was not possible.

The first official institution to decide on the sighting of the Moon in Pakistan was formed in 1948; an executive order set up a central committee which would receive reports from districts committees from all the regions, including its now separated eastern part. The meteorological department, too, was consulted before a decision on Moon sighting was made.

In 1958, this mechanism faced its first reported shock as Peshawar celebrated Eidul Fitr a day before the rest of the country. This was the first of many controversies to come, created by regional, and sometimes political, differences over Moon sighting. In the 1960s, Karachi differed with the central government's decisions on the sighting of the Moon three times in seven years.

On March 17, 1961, the official mechanism all but self-destructed. Ayub Khan’s military government made an announcement about Eidul Fitr and then, in a late night development, changed its announcement without consulting the committee and its chairman, Ehteshamul Haq Thanvi, a respected cleric from Karachi. The residents of the port city were already chafed by the government’s decision to shift the federal capital from Karachi to Islamabad and saw the shifting of Eid day as another political snub. As a result, most parts of Karachi observed a fast on March 18 while most of the rest of the country – except, of course, Peshawar – observed Eid that day. Peshawar had already marked Eid on March 17, following a Saudi announcement. Pakistan thus had three Eids that year.

A few years later, the problem cropped up again. Both in 1966 and 1967, Ayub Khan’s government changed its earlier Moon sighting announcements, again late in the night. In the latter year, the final official declaration that the Eid moon had been sighted appeared particularly galling since the weather that day had made it impossible to see the Moon. Jamaat-e-Islami (JI), a Karachi-based party which was campaigning at the time for the removal of Ayub Khan’s decade-long authoritarian rule, vehemently opposed the official decision. Most residents of Karachi sided with JI and did not observe Eid on the government-designated day.

Ayub Khan’s administration saw this as an act of subversion and arrested three leading scholars, including JI founding chief Abul A’la Maududi, Thanvi and Muhammad Hussain Naeemi, a prominent Barelvi scholar from Lahore. The trio were sent behind bars for three months. The government’s jitters gave rise to the urban legend that it had changed its announcement only to avoid having Eid on a Friday — the coincidence was seen as ‘a bad omen’ for the rulers.

In order to resolve these conflicts, the government of Zulfikar Ali Bhutto decided to give legislative cover to the official Moon sighting mechanism. In January 1974, the National Assembly passed a law for the creation of a Central Ruet-e-Hilal Committee as well as four zonal/provincial committees. The central committee was to have nine members, including a woman, and it was bound to consult the zonal/provincial committees before making any decision.

With this purportedly consultative and inclusive arrangement, the government expected an end to any future controversies over Moon sighting. Retaining Thanvi as the head of the central committee, the law also stipulated that its members, including the chairman, would have only a single three-year tenure. Before the Eid ul Fitr of June 2017 the government had forcibly sent Mufti Shahabuddin Popalzai of Peshawar-based Masjid Qasim abroad just ahead of the Eid ul Fitr in a bid to end the Moon-sighting controversy, his colleague Maulana Khairul Bashar alleged.

=== Other controversies ===
Since its creation in 1974, the status of the Central Ruet-e-Hilal Committee has been controversial as it frequently refuses the "Witnesses" (Shahadats) from other Muslim sects. Every year at the beginning and at the end of the month of Ramzan, the decisions of new moon sighting by Central Ruet-e-Hilal Committee is criticized in Pakistan. Mufti Shahabuddin Popalzai of Qasim Ali Khan Mosque separately announces the new moon of Ramazan and Shawal every year in Peshawar. Pakistani journalists have on many occasions demanded for adopting new mechanism for the sighting of new moon.

== See also ==
- Chaand Raat
