= Directorate General of Religious Education =

Regulator of religious seminaries in Pakistan

Directorate General of Religious Education (DGRE)
- Abbreviation: DGRE
- Formation: 2019
- Founder: Government of Pakistan
- Founded at: Islamabad, Pakistan
- Type: Governmental organization
- Legal status: Active
- Purpose: Regulation and mainstreaming of religious seminaries
- Headquarters: G-8 Sector, Islamabad, Pakistan
- Location: Pakistan
- Region served: Nationwide
- Director General: Major General (R) Ghulam Qamar
- Parent organization: Government of Pakistan
- Budget: Rs 2 billion (initial allocation)
- Website: www.dgre.gov.pk

The Directorate General of Religious Education (DGRE) is a Pakistani government agency with the aim of integrating religious seminaries into mainstream society and the broader educational system. In December 2019, the then education minister Shafqat Mahmood officially launched the DGRE.

== History and background ==
The DGRE was founded by the federal government, marking a historic first for the country. Its purpose is to assist seminaries in the registration process and serve as a center for their facilitation.

The government is working towards integrating religious seminaries into the mainstream educational framework. The objective is to transition from the existing three separate education systems—public schools, private schools, and Islamic religious schools—towards a unified curriculum. This initiative seeks to provide equal educational opportunities for all students and bridge the educational gap between religious and modern teachings.

== Regional offices ==
The initial regional office of the DGRE was inaugurated in Lahore. The DGRE, headquartered in Islamabad, has subsequently expanded to encompass a total of 16 regional offices spread across the nation.

== Registration of seminaries ==
The DGRE successfully registered approximately 5,000 seminaries throughout Pakistan, utilizing its network of 16 regional offices for this purpose. This achievement was notable given the estimated 35,000 seminaries present in the country at that time.

== List of Director-Generals ==
S#	Name	Office Assumed	Office Left
1.	Dr. Ghulam Sarwar Jamali	2021	2024
2.	Major General(R) Ghulam Qamar	2025	Incumbent

== See also ==
- Ministry of Federal Education and Professional Training
- Madrassas in Pakistan
