= Abdul Khabeer Azad =

Pakistani Islamic Scholar

- عبدالخبیر آزاد
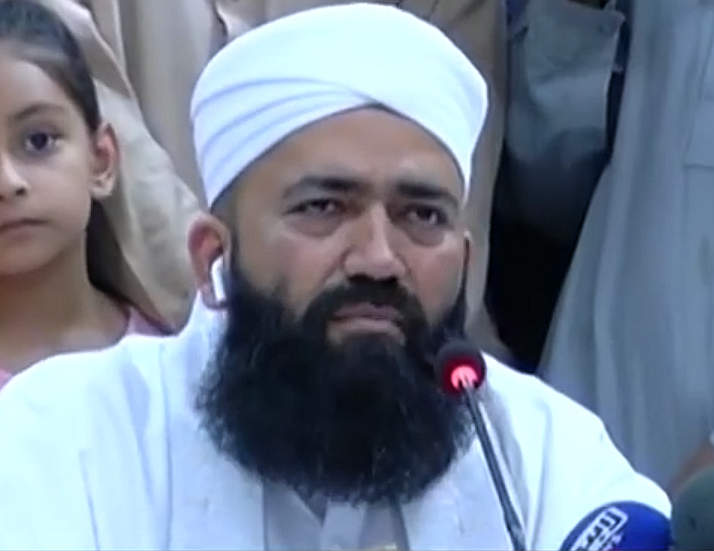
- Abdul Khabeer Azad in 2018

Chairman of Ruet-e-Hilal Committee
- Incumbent
- Assumed office 30 December 2020
- Preceded by: Muneeb-ur-Rehman

Imam and Khatib of Badshahi Mosque
- Incumbent
- Assumed office 15 January 2003
- Preceded by: Abdul Qadir Azad

Personal life
- Parent: Abdul Qadir Azad (father)
- Known for: Chairman of Ruet-e-Hilal Committee
- Occupation: Islamic scholar

Religious life
- Religion: Islam

Syed Muhammad Abdul Khabeer Azad (Urdu: سید محمد عبدالخبیر آزاد) is a Pakistani Islamic cleric who is the current Grand Imam of Badshahi Mosque since 2003 and the chairman of Ruet-e-Hilal Committee since 2020.

== Early life and career ==
He is the son of Muhammad Abdul Qadir Azad who served as the former Grand Imam of Badshahi Mosque in Lahore, Pakistan. He is the khateeb of Badshahi Mosque since his father's death in 2003, and was appointed as the chairman of Ruet-e-Hilal Committee on 30 December 2020 by Ministry of Religious Affairs and Inter-faith Harmony, Government of Pakistan succeeding its long-term serving chairman Mufti Muneeb-ur-Rehman.

== See also ==
- Muhammad Abdullah Ghazi
