= Winter Offensive =

Winter Offensive or variation may refer to:

- Miklós Zrínyi's Winter Campaign of Austro-Turkish War (1663–1664)
- French Marshal General Turenne's Winter Campaign of 1674–75 against forces of the Holy Roman Empire during the Franco-Dutch War
- The Austrian invasion of Hungary in 1848–49 during the Hungarian War of Independence
- Winter operations 1914–1915 by the British Empire against Imperial Germany during World War I
- First Winter Campaign of 1919–20 between the Ukrainian People's Republic and Bolsheviks during the Ukrainian–Soviet War
- Second Winter Campaign of 1921 between the Ukrainian People's Army and Soviet Ukraine during the Ukrainian–Soviet War
- 1939–40 Winter Offensive by the Republic of China against Imperial Japan and Mengjiang during the Second Sino-Japanese War
- The Winter War of 1939–40 between Finland and the Soviet Union
- Soviet Winter campaign of 1941–42 against Nazi Germany during World War II
- Winter Offensive of 1947 in Northeast China by the People's Liberation Army against the National Revolutionary Army during the Chinese Civil War
- Turkish army winter campaign of 1994–95 against the Kurdistan Workers' Party as part of the Kurdish–Turkish conflict

== See also ==
- Spring Offensive (disambiguation)
- Summer Offensive (disambiguation)
