= Muneeb-ur-Rehman =

Pakistani Muslim scholar (born 1945)

Grand Mufti of Pakistan (Barelvi) Muneeb-ur-Rehman
- منیب الرحمن
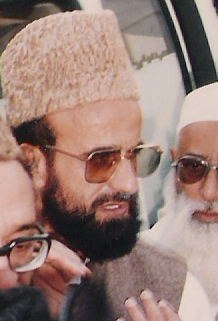
- Muneeb-ur-Rehman

Chairman of Ruet-e-Hilal Committee
- In office 18 October 1998 – 30 December 2020
- Preceded by: Muhammad Abdullah Ghazi
- Succeeded by: Abdul Khabeer Azad

Personal life
- Born: Muneeb-ur-Rehman; 8 February 1945 (age 81) Mansehra, North-West Frontier Province, British India
- Notable work: Tafheem-ul-Masail
- Education: Darul 'Uloom Amjadia
- Known for: Educational leadership, religious leadership and author of books
- Occupation: professor at Jinnah University for Women
- Honors: The 500 Most Influential Muslims (2009–2020)

Religious life
- Religion: Islam
- Denomination: Sunni
- Creed: Maturidi
- Movement: Barelvi
- Profession: Islamic scholar

Muneeb-ur-Rehman (Note: (Hindko/Urdu: مفتی محمد منیب الرحمن)) (born 8 February 1945) is a Pakistani mufti and former chairman of Ruet-e-Hilal Committee. He is a professor at Jinnah University for Women.

== Life and education ==
Muneeb-ur-Rehman was born on 8 February 1945 in a Pashtun family of the Tanoli tribe in Mansehra, Khyber Pakhtunkwa, Pakistan. He completed his master's in Islamic Studies. Besides gaining a Bachelor in Law and Education degree, he also received education in Arabic Languages. He completed a master's degree from Darul Uloom Amjadia.

== Ruet e Hilal Committee ==
In 1998, Government of Pakistan appointed him chairman of Ruet-e-Hilal Committee. He served for approximately 22 years as chairman and removed from his office on 30 December 2020. He is also considered as the Grand Mufti Of Pakistan by Sunni Barelvi.

=== Controversies ===
In December 1999, Mohammed Yousuf Qureshi, a member of the committee from Khyber Pakhtunkhwa, accused Muneeb-ur-Rehman and others of distrusting testimonies from his home province to make a hasty announcement that the new moon had not been sighted anywhere in the country. Peshawar has always remained a controversial place when it comes to moon sightings.

== Books ==
- Khulasa E Tafseer
- Arbaeen e Tijarat Wa Maeshat
- Tafheem-ul-Masail (12 Vol)
- Qanoon-e-Shariat
- Tafseer Surah-Tu-Nisa
- Usool-e-Fiqah Islam
- Sultan Shamasuddin Altamsh: History and Story
- Zakat Ke Masail
