= Spring Offensive (band) =

UK indie rock band

Spring Offensive were an indie rock band based in Oxford and London, UK. The band were active between 2009 and 2014, releasing several EPs and singles, as well as a 2014 studio album, Young Animal Hearts. A compilation album, Separate, was released in 2020 after the band's break up. The band appeared in NME, Clash and Time Out, toured with Stornoway and others, and played festivals such as T in the Park, Maifeld Derby, Liverpool Sound City and the Great Escape Festival. The band was playlisted by BBC Radio 1. They reformed in 2020 for a one-off show in London that was postponed until March 2022 due to the COVID-19 pandemic.
