= Afghanistan fighting season =

Post-winter fighting season during the 2001–2021 war in Afghanistan

Coalition fatalities per month from the start of the war until 2015, showing seasonal peaks around the summer months.

The Afghanistan fighting season refers to the cyclical restarting of fighting every spring during the War in Afghanistan (2001–2021) due to weather and economic factors. It generally ran from April to October and saw more combat deaths than the off-season. The Taliban, who were the main insurgent group during the War, would annually call their post-winter fighting restart as their spring offensive.

== Factors ==
Afghanistan has a harsh winter and a poor transportation system, leaving many parts of the country snowbound until spring. Many routes into Pakistan, where recruits and weapons come from, are similarly impassable for months.

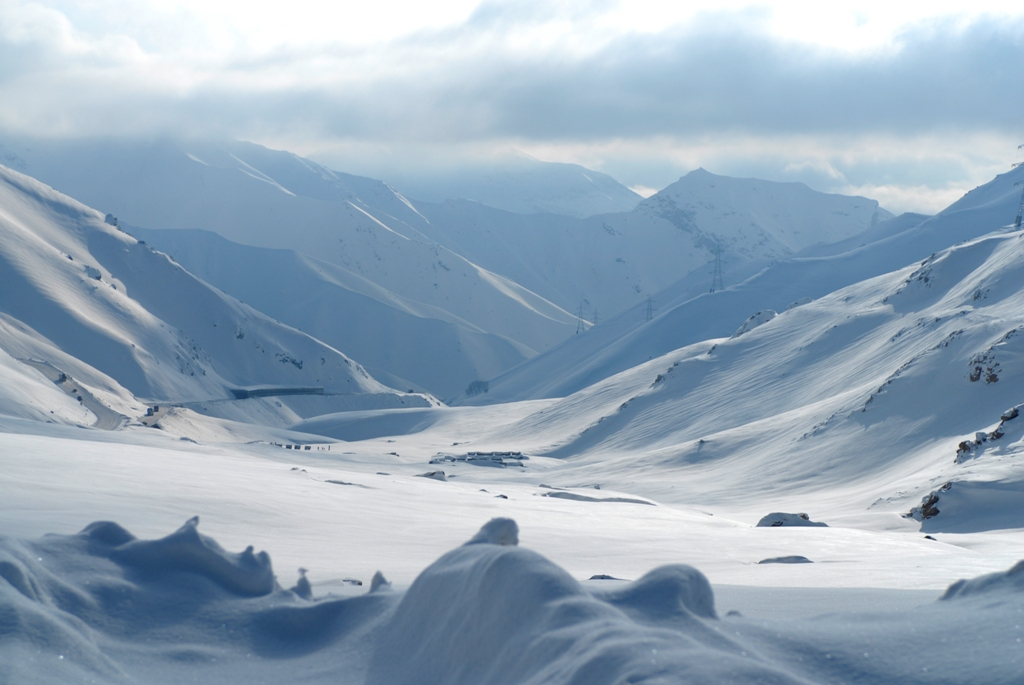
The winter causes many key connections, such as the Salang Pass pictured here, to be impassable due to heavy snowfall

Opium poppies are planted beginning in October and harvest begins in April. Manpower that was tied up in the opium trade is freed up for fighting between April and October.

Madrassas in Pakistan go on recess during the spring. New recruits subjected to religious and military training often volunteer to fight in Afghanistan.

== See also ==
- Fighting Season – an Australian drama about the Australian war in Afghanistan
