= Badshahi Mosque =

Mughal-era mosque in Lahore, Pakistan

- شاہی مسیت بادشاہی مسجد
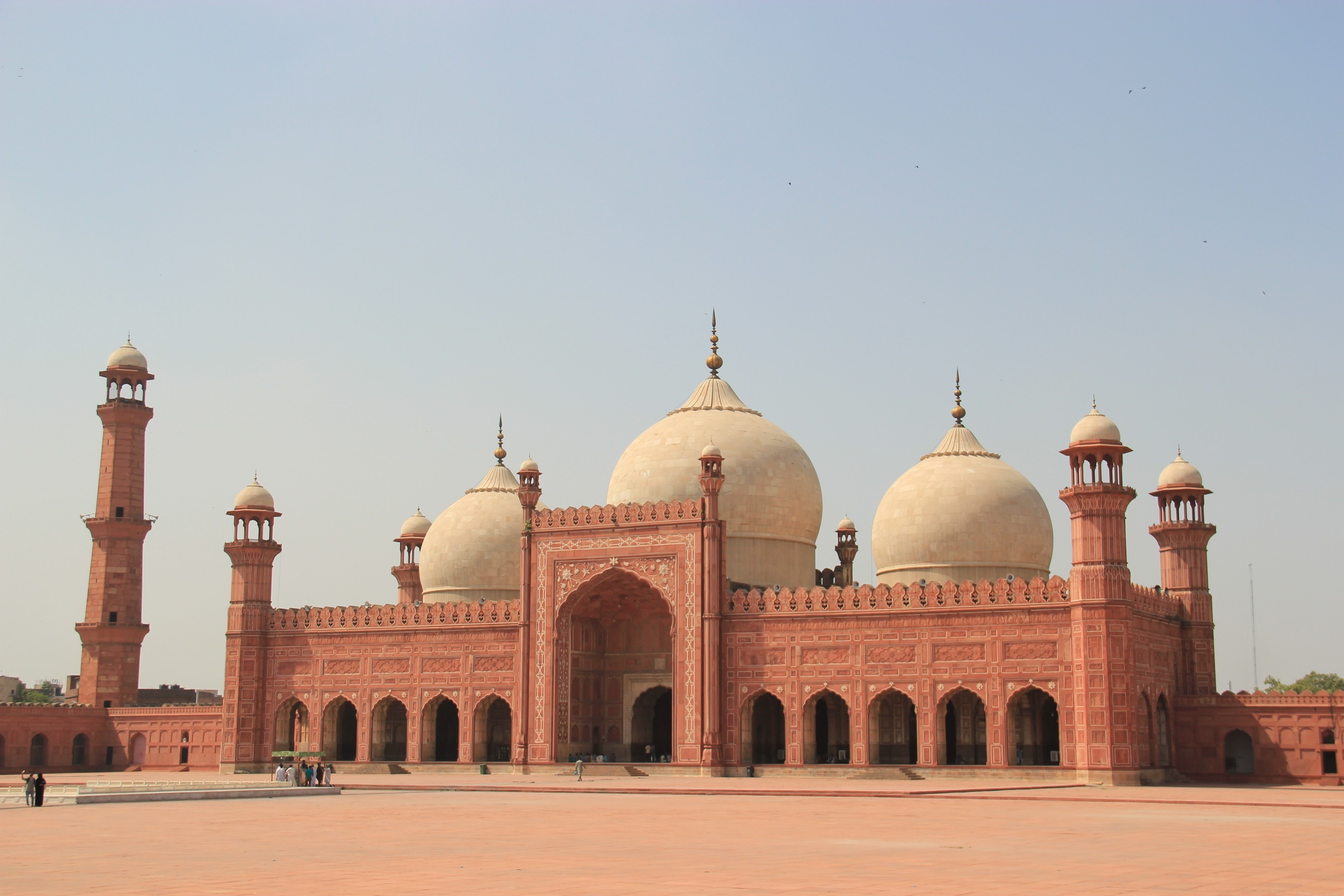

- Location within Lahore Location within Punjab, Pakistan Location within Pakistan

Religion
- Affiliation: Islam
- District: Lahore
- Province: Punjab
- Ecclesiastical or organisational status: Active
- Leadership: Abdul Khabeer Azad
- Year consecrated: 1670; 356 years ago

Location
- Location: Lahore, Punjab, Pakistan
- Coordinates: 31°35′17″N 74°18′34″E

Architecture
- Type: Congregational mosque
- Style: Indo-Islamic, Mughal
- Founder: Aurangzeb
- Completed: 1673; 353 years ago

Specifications
- Capacity: 100,000
- Length: 170 m (560 ft)
- Width: 170 m (560 ft)
- Dome: 3
- Minarets: 8 (4 major, 4 minor)
- Minaret height: 196 ft (60 m)
- Materials: Red sandstone, marble

The Badshahi Mosque (Note: Punjabi: شاہی مسیت, romanised: śāhī masīt; Urdu: بادشاہی مسجد, romanised: bādśāhī masjid) is a Mughal-era imperial mosque located in Lahore, Punjab, Pakistan. It was constructed between 1671 and 1673 by the Mughal emperor Aurangzeb, opposite to the Lahore Fort in the northern outskirts of the historic Walled City. It is widely considered to be an iconic landmark of the country.

The mosque is an important example of the Mughal architecture, with an exterior that is decorated with carved red sandstone with marble inlay. It was the largest mosque built during the Mughal era, and remained the largest in the world for over three hundred years until the late 20th century. It is currently the third largest mosque in Pakistan.

== Location ==
The mosque is located adjacent to the Walled City of Lahore. The entrance to the mosque lies on the western side of the rectangular Hazuri Bagh, and faces the Alamgiri Gate of the Lahore Fort, which is located on the eastern side of the Hazuri Bagh. The mosque is also located next to the Roshnai Gate, one of the original thirteen gates of Lahore, which is located to the southern side of the Hazuri Bagh.

Near the entrance of the mosque lies the tomb of Muhammad Iqbal, a poet widely revered in Pakistan as the founder of the Pakistan Movement which led to the creation of Pakistan as a homeland for the Muslims of British India. Also located near the mosque's entrance is the tomb of Sir Sikandar Hayat Khan, who is credited for playing a major role in preservation and restoration of the mosque.

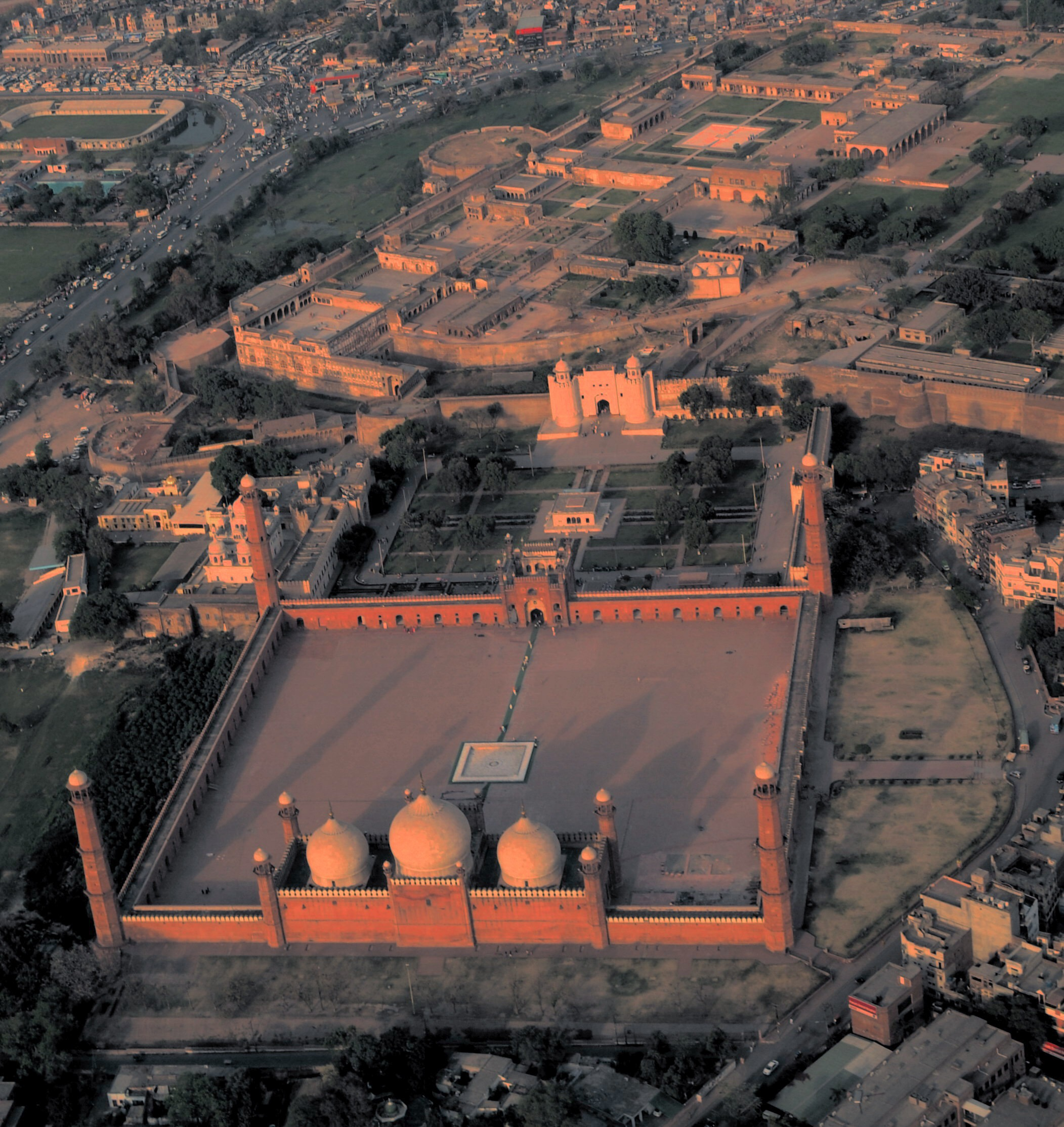
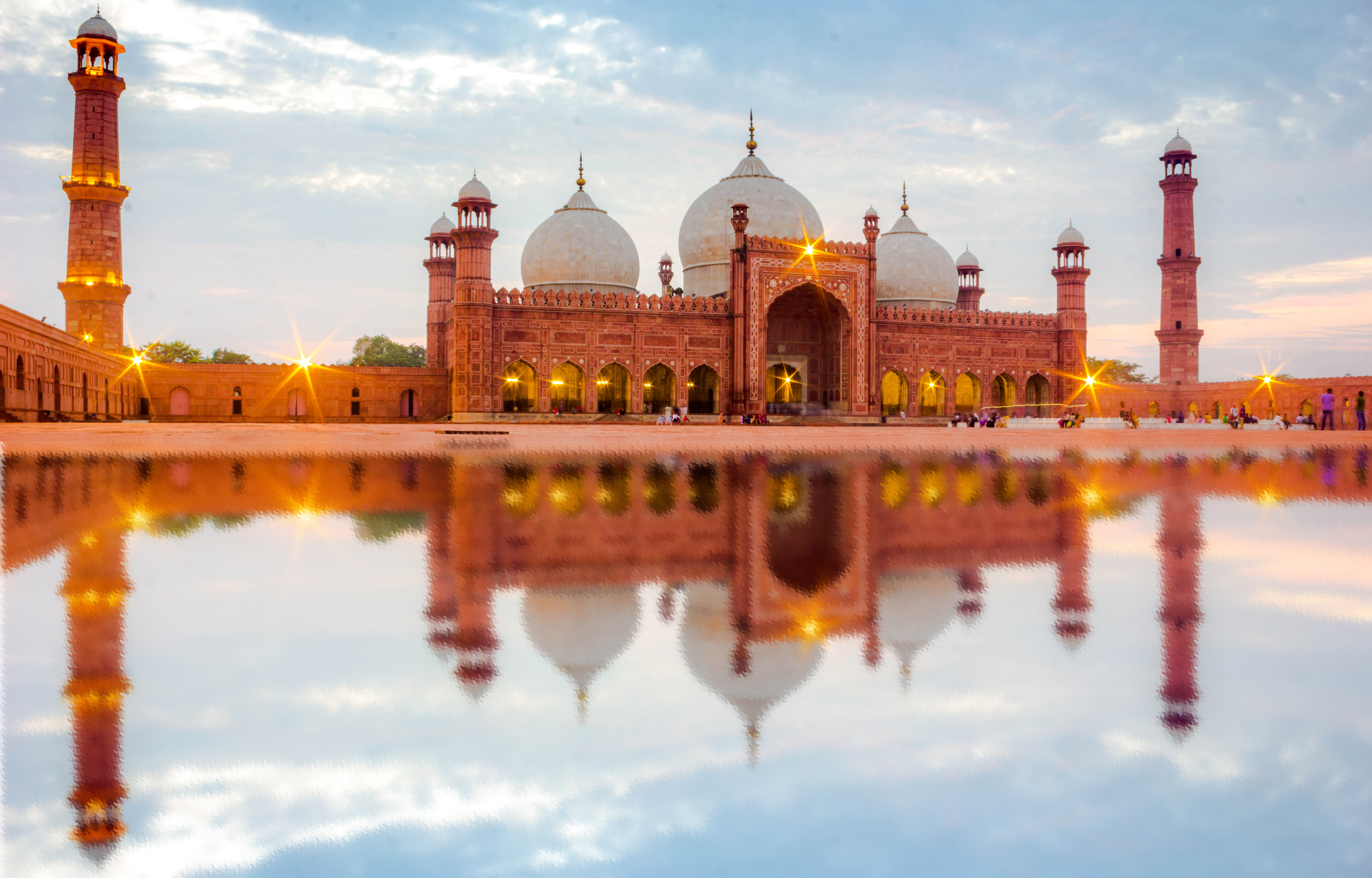
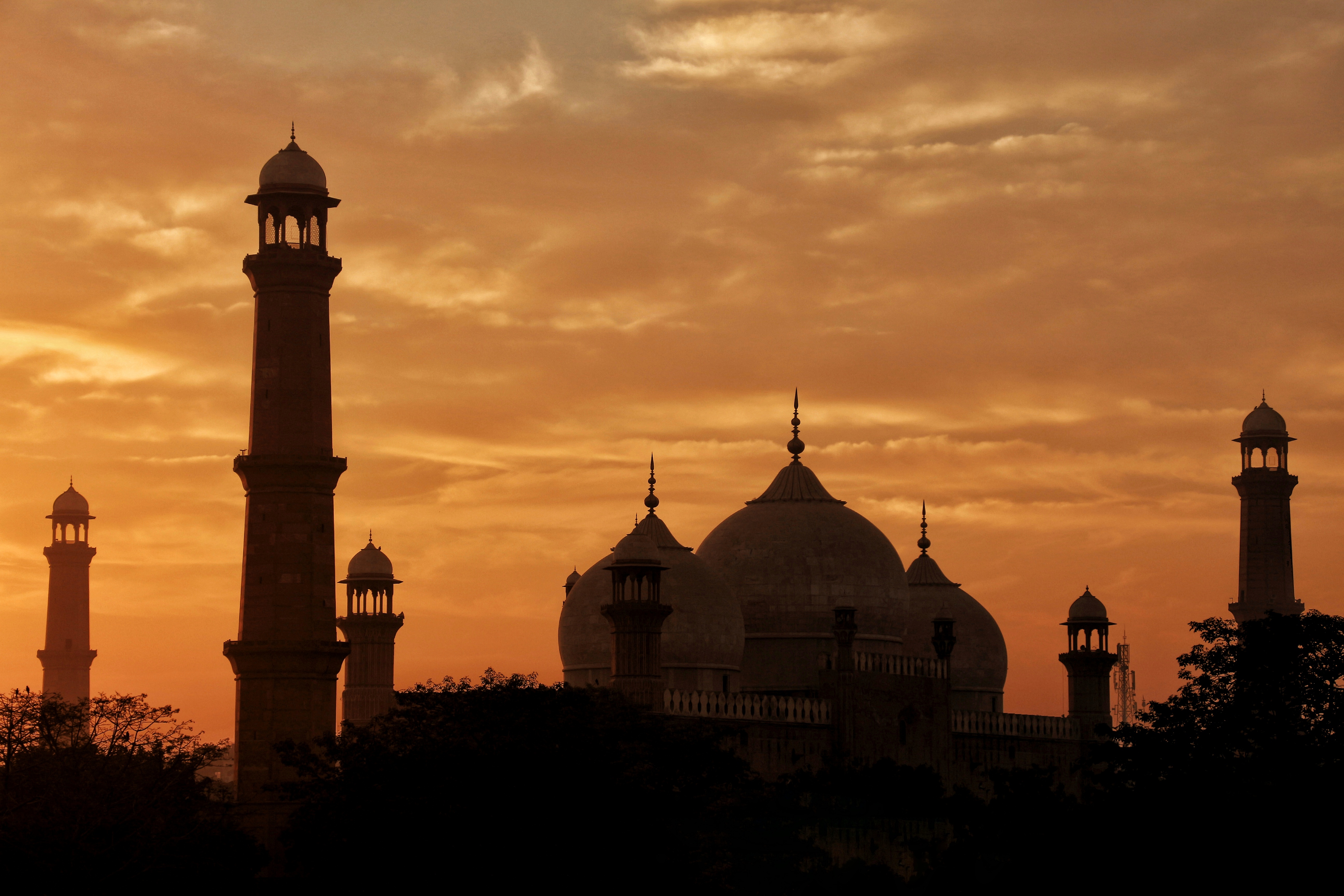
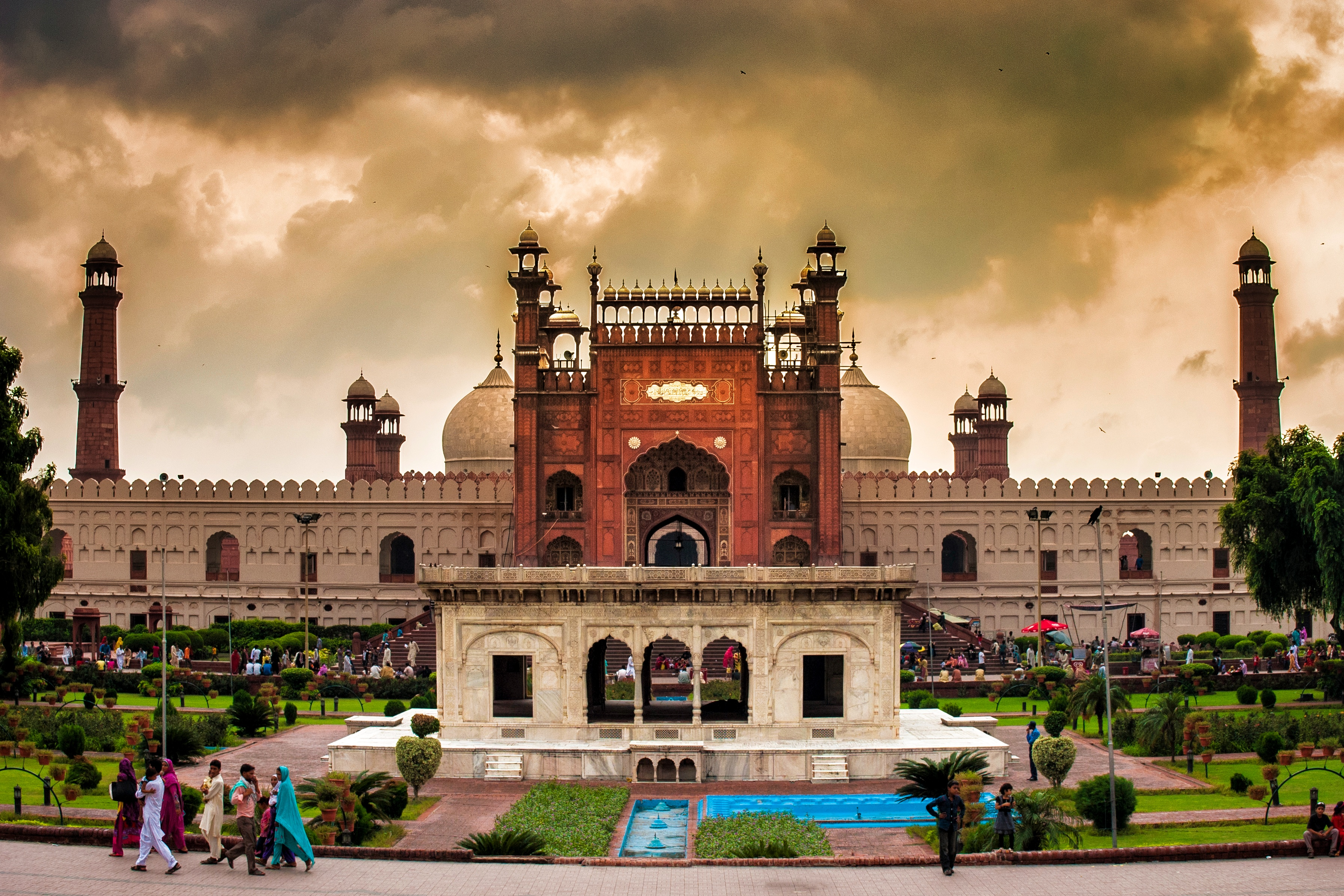
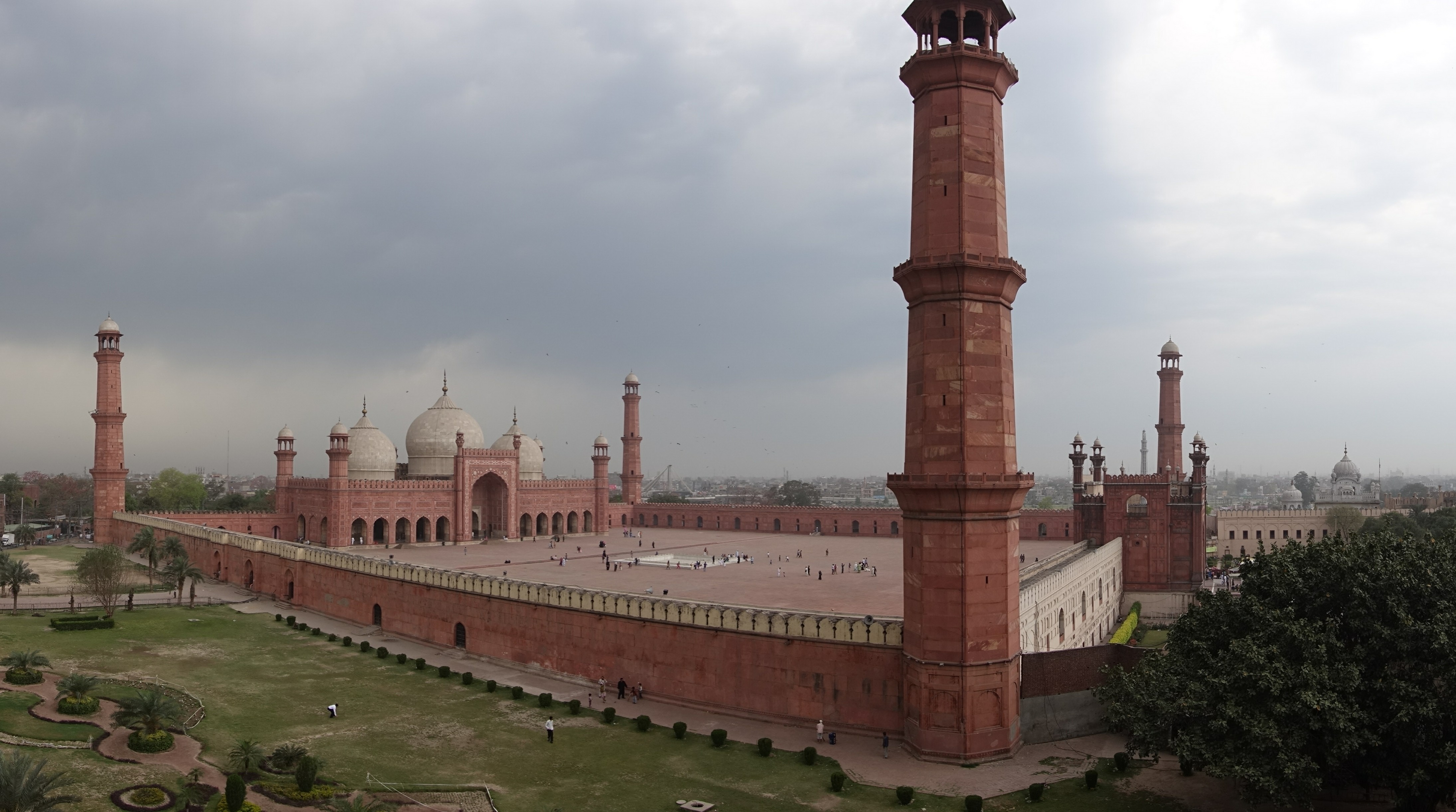
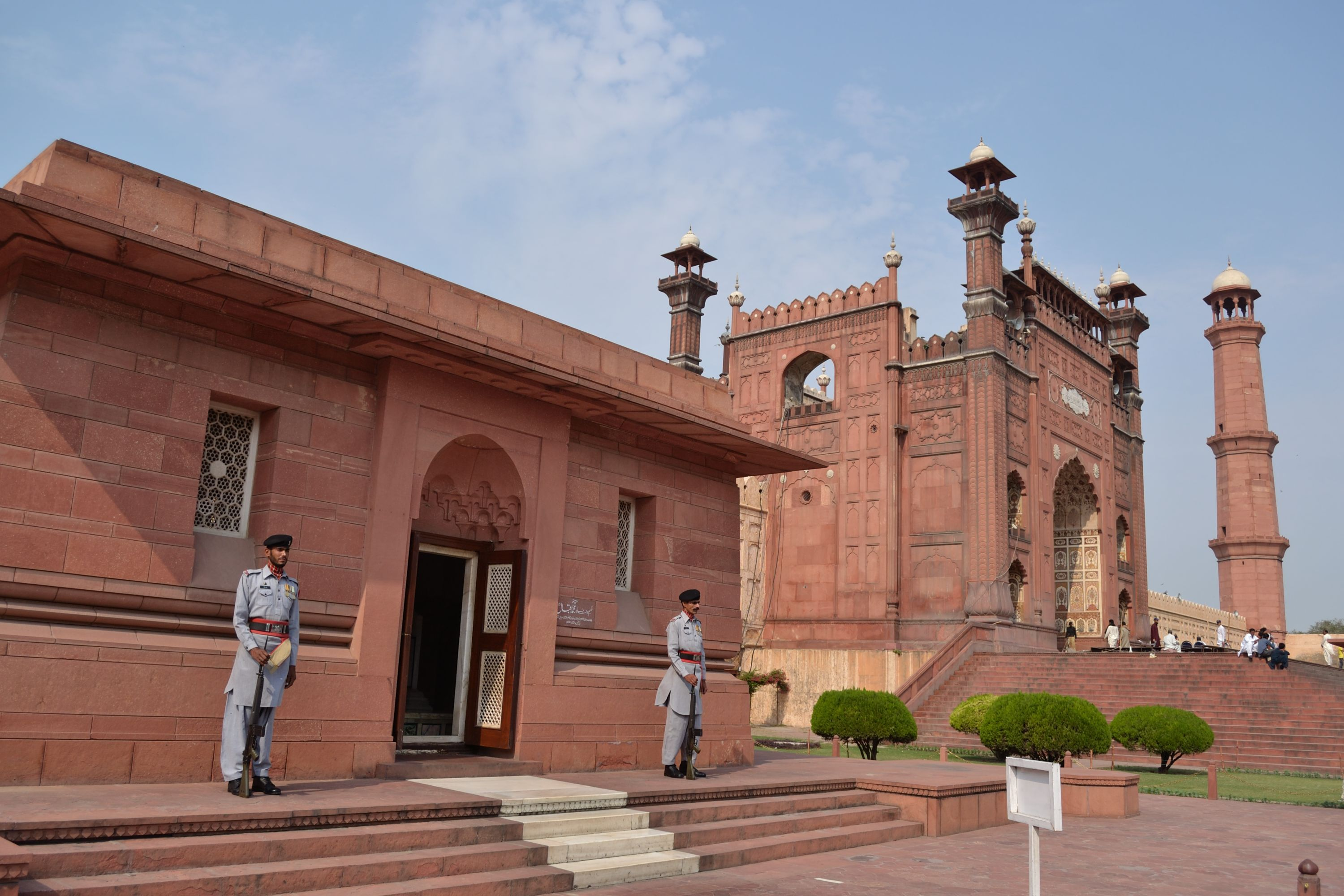
Various views of the Badshahi mosque. From top, left to right: a panoramic view of the mosque; an internal view of the mosque; an evening silhouette; the mosque standing across the Hazuri Bagh from Lahore Fort; a view of the mosque from the Alamgiri Gate; and the tomb of Allama Iqbal, located north of the mosque's gateway.

== History ==
The sixth Mughal Emperor Aurangzeb chose Lahore as the site for a new mosque. Aurangzeb, unlike the previous emperors, was not a major patron of art and architecture and instead focused, during much of his reign, on various military conquests which expanded the Mughal realm. The mosque was built to commemorate Aurangzeb's military campaigns in southern India, in particular against the Maratha ruler Shivaji. As a symbol of the mosque's importance, it was built directly across from the Lahore Fort and its Alamgiri Gate, which was concurrently built by Aurangzeb during construction of the mosque.

The mosque was commissioned in 1671, with construction overseen by the emperor's foster brother, and governor of Lahore, Muzaffar Hussein — also known by his title Fidai Khan Koka. After only two years of construction, the mosque was opened in 1673/74.

=== Sikh era ===
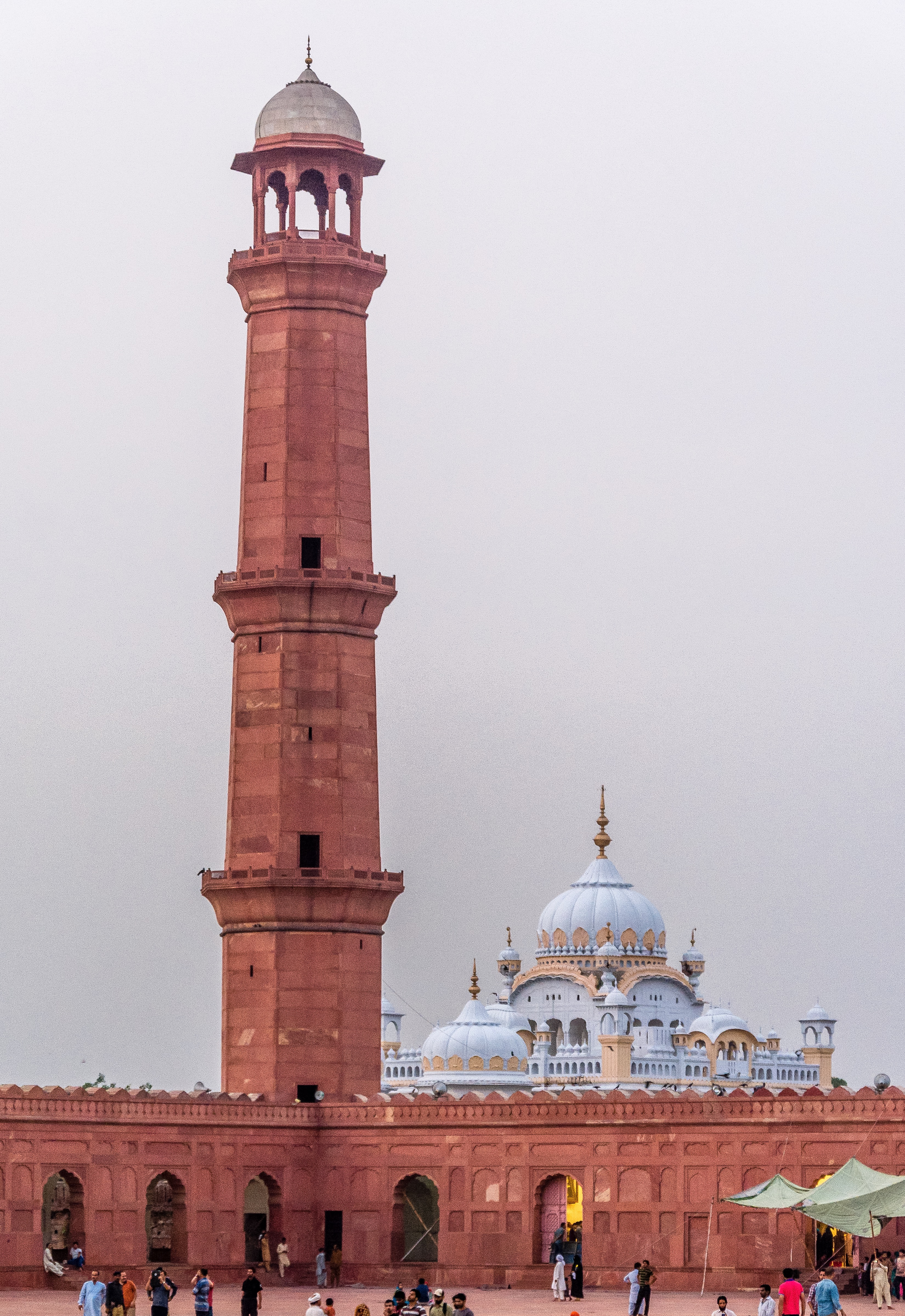
Badshahi Mosque fell into disrepair during the Sikh rule; the Samadhi of Ranjit Singh (white edifice on right) was built next to the mosque.

On 7 July 1799, the Sikh army of Ranjit Singh took control of Lahore. After the capture of the city maharaja Ranjit Singh used its vast courtyard as a stable for his army horses, and its 80 Hujras (small study rooms surrounding the courtyard) as quarters for his soldiers and as magazines for military stores. In 1818, he built a marble edifice in the Hazuri Bagh facing the mosque, known as the Hazuri Bagh Baradari, which he used as his official royal court of audience. Marble slabs for the baradari may have been plundered by the Sikhs from other monuments in Lahore. In 1839, after his death, construction of a samadhi in his memory was begun by his son and successor, Kharak Singh, at a site adjacent to the mosque.

During the First Anglo-Sikh War in 1841, Ranjit Singh's son, Sher Singh, used the mosque's large minarets for placement of zamburahs or light guns which were used to bombard the supporters of Chand Kaur, who had taken refuge in the besieged Lahore Fort. In one of these bombardments, the fort's Diwan-e-Aam (Hall of Public Audience) was destroyed, but was subsequently rebuilt in the British era. During this time, Henri de La Rouche, a French cavalry officer employed in the army of Sher Singh, also used a tunnel connecting the Badshahi Mosque to the Lahore Fort to temporarily store gunpowder.

=== British rule ===
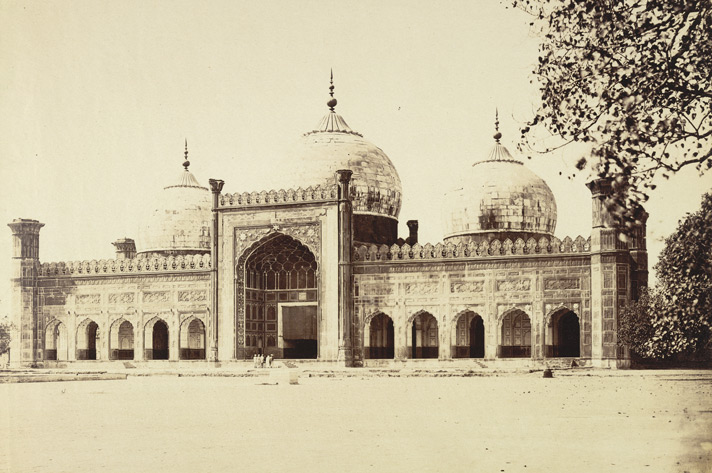
Badshahi Mosque c. 1870

In 1849, the British seized control of Lahore from the Sikh Empire. During the British Raj, the mosque and the adjoining fort continued to be used as a military garrison. The 80 cells built into the walls surrounding its vast courtyard were demolished by the British after the Indian Rebellion of 1857, so as to prevent them from being used for anti-British activities. The cells were replaced by open arcades known as dalans.

Because of increasing Muslim resentment against the use of the mosque as a military garrison, by the help of Khan Bahadur Nawab Barkat Ali Khan the British set up the Badshahi Mosque Authority in 1852 to oversee the restoration and to re-establish it as a place of religious worship. From then onwards, piecemeal repairs were carried out under the supervision of the Badshahi Mosque Authority. The building was officially handed back to the Muslim community in 1856 by John Lawrence, the then Chief Commissioner of the Punjab Province, re-establishing it as a mosque.

In April 1919, after the Amritsar Massacre, a mixed Sikh, Hindu and Muslim crowd of an estimated 25,000–35,000 gathered in the mosque's courtyard in protest. A speech by Gandhi was read at the event by Khalifa Shuja-ud-Din, who would later become Speaker of the Provincial Assembly of the Punjab.

Extensive repairs commenced from 1939 onwards, when Sikandar Hayat Khan, the Premier of the Punjab, began raising funds for this purpose. Renovation was supervised by the architect Nawab Alam Yar Jung Bahadur. As Khan was largely credited for extensive restorations to the mosque, he was buried adjacent to the mosque in the Hazuri Bagh.

=== Post-independence ===
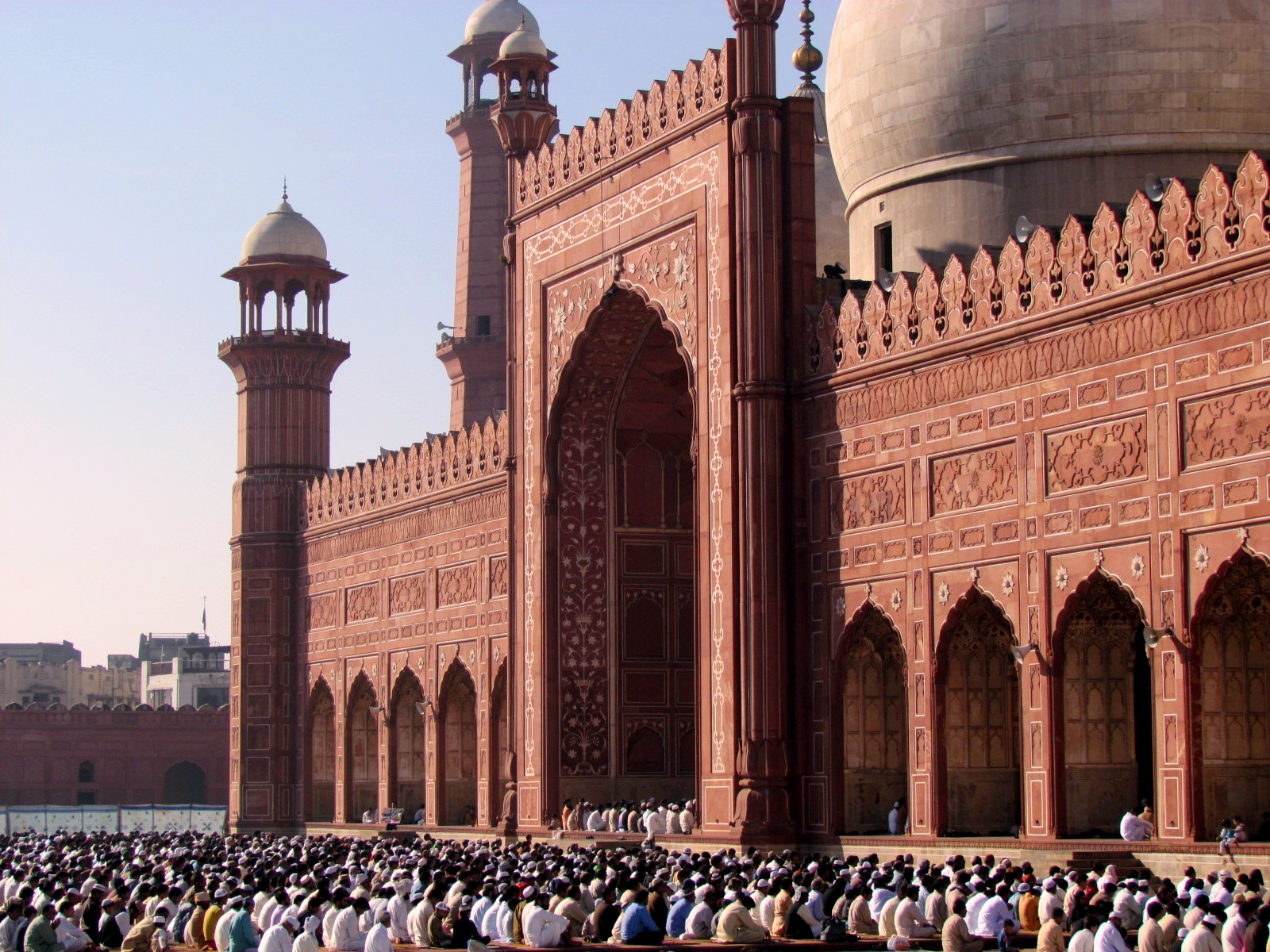
The mosque is very busy during the Islamic festivals of Eid and Ramadan.

Restoration works begun in 1939 continued after the Independence of Pakistan, and were completed in 1960 at a total cost of 4.8 million Rupees.

On the occasion of the 2nd Islamic Summit held at Lahore on 22 February 1974, thirty-nine heads of Muslim states offered their Friday prayers in the Badshahi Mosque, including, among others, Zulfiqar Ali Bhutto of Pakistan, Faisal of Saudi Arabia, Muammar Gaddafi, Yasser Arafat, and Sabah III Al-Salim Al-Sabah of Kuwait. In 1993, the mosque was included in a tentative list as a UNESCO World Heritage Site. In 2000, the marble inlay in the main prayer hall was repaired. In 2008, replacement work on the red sandstone tiles on the mosque's large courtyard was initiated, using red sandstone imported from the original Mughal source near Jaipur, in the Indian state of Rajasthan.

== Architecture ==
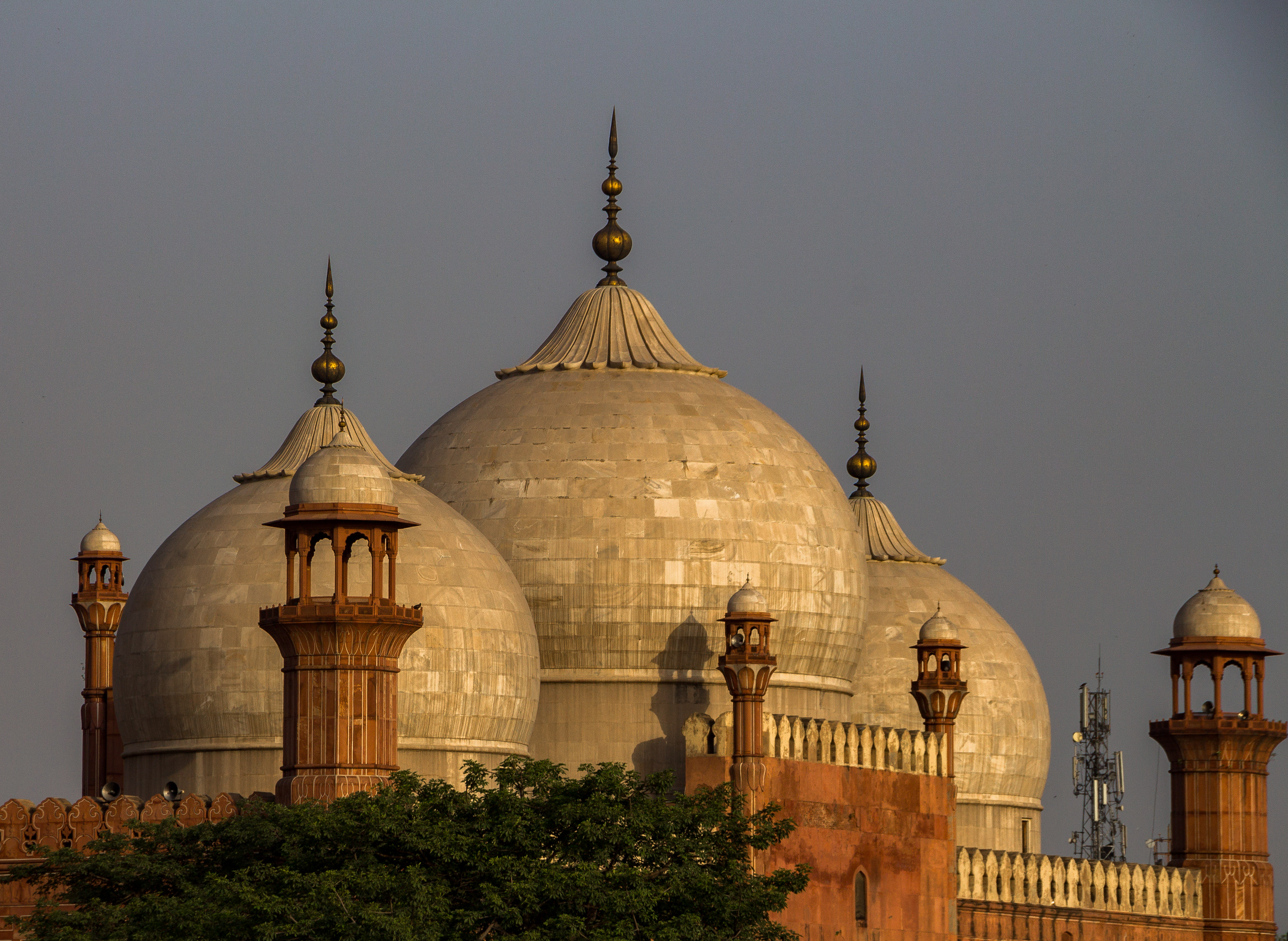
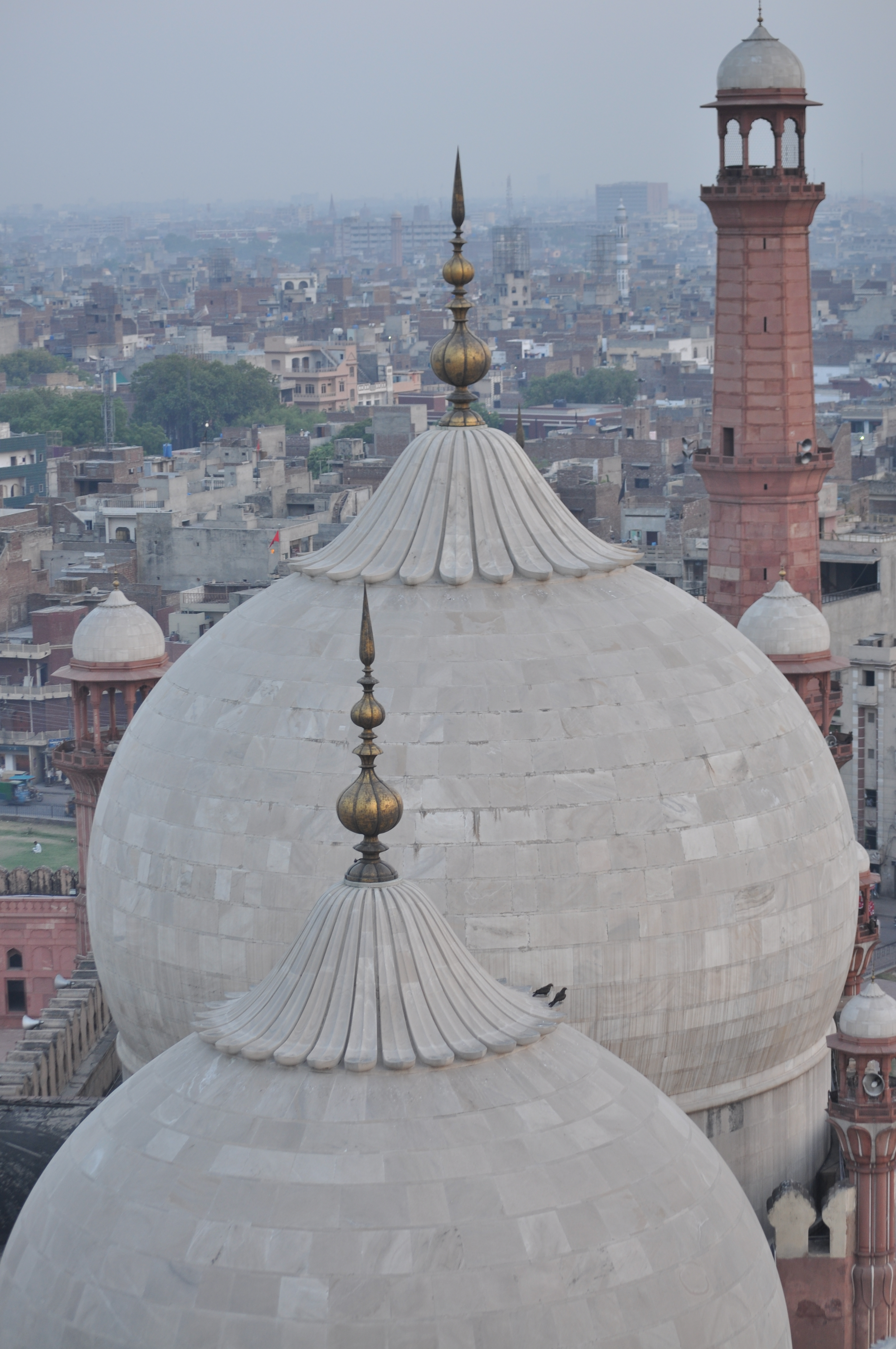
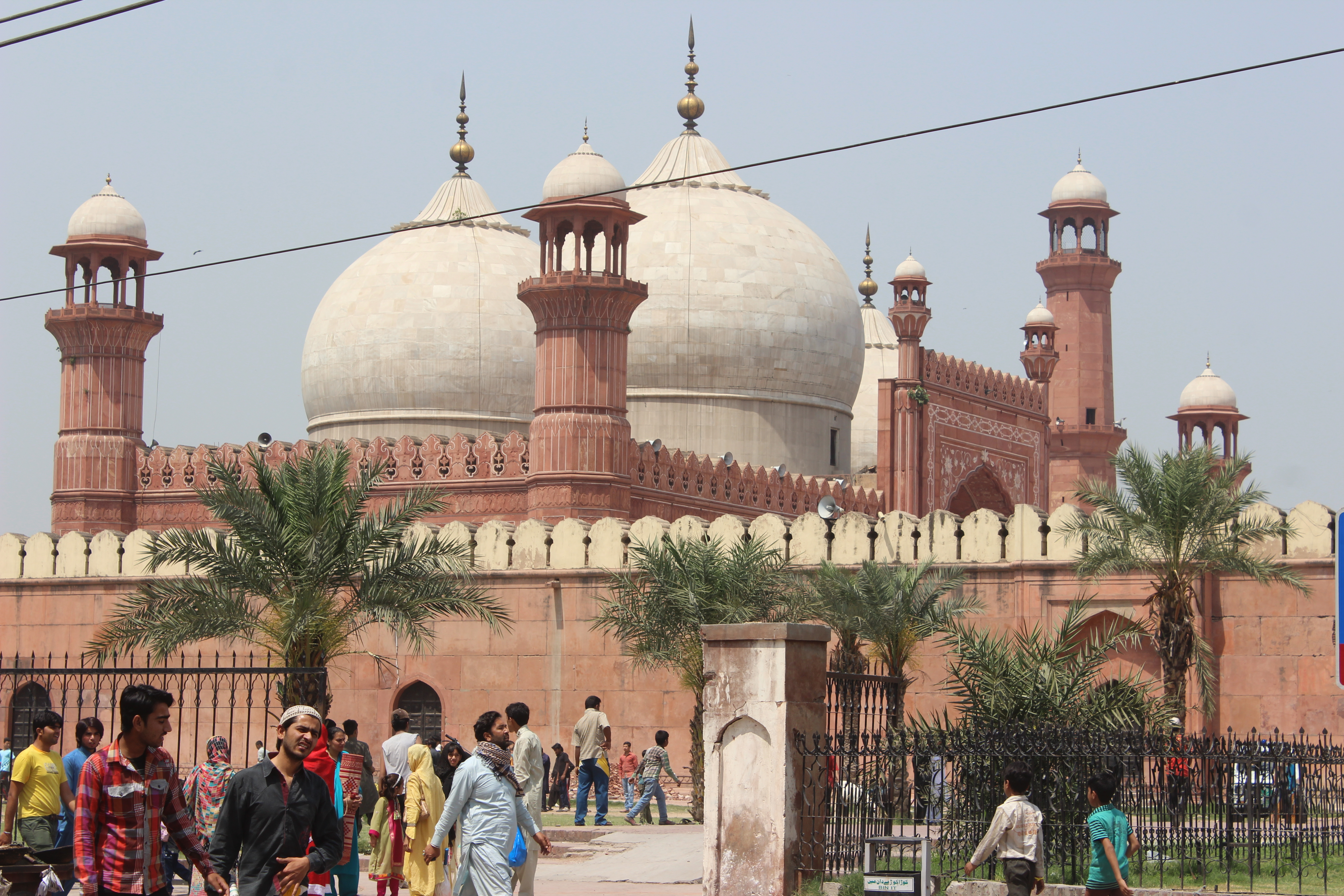
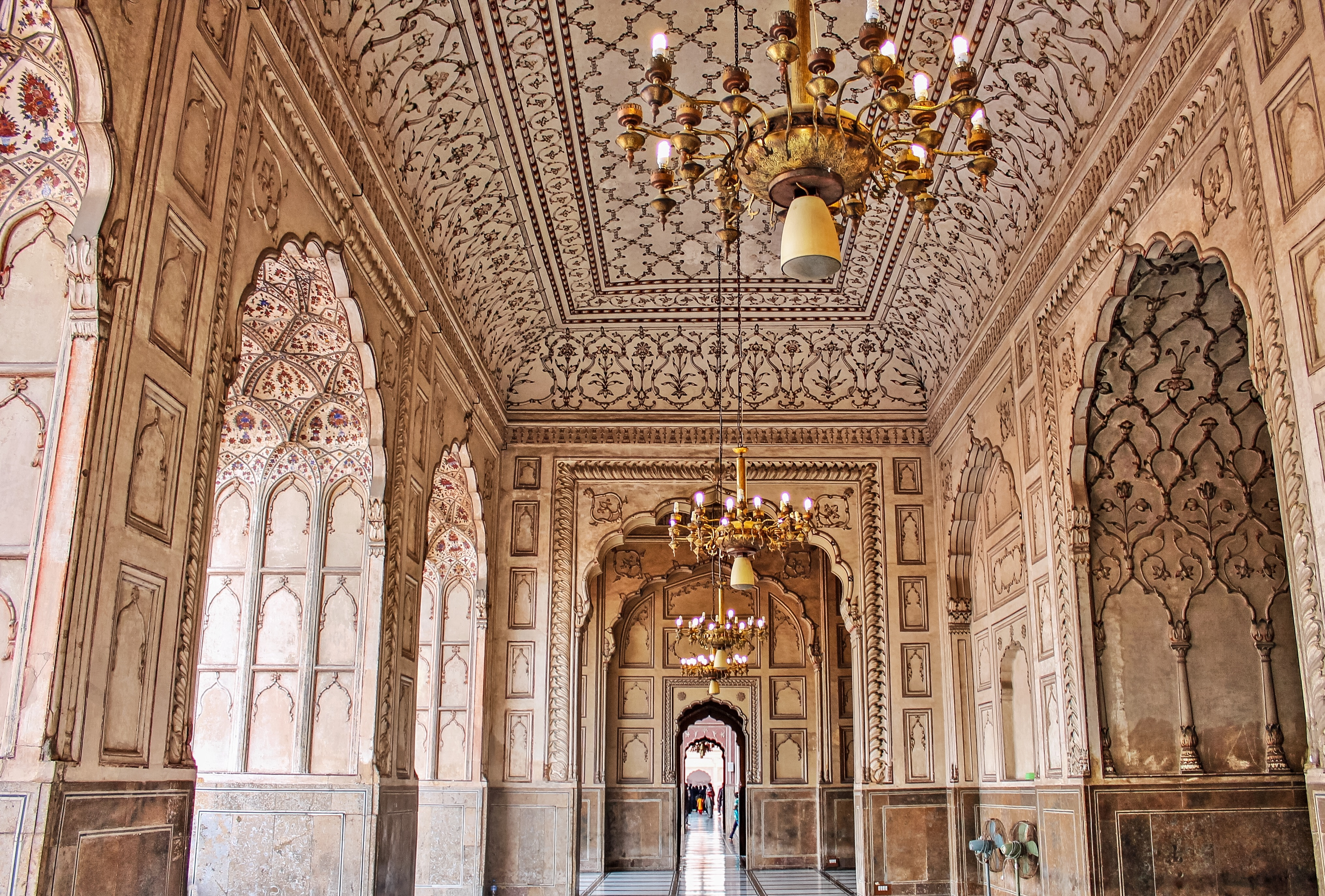
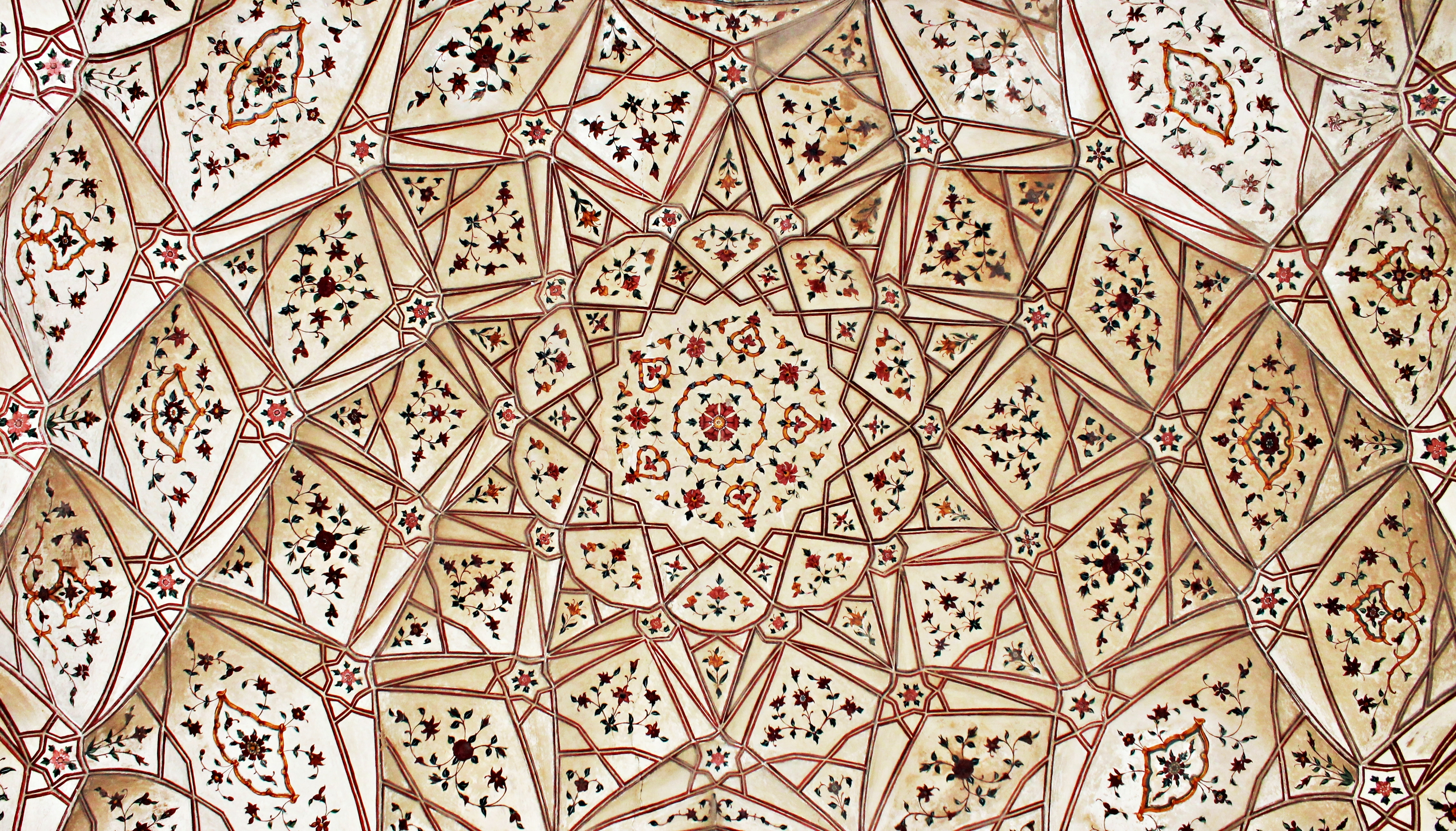
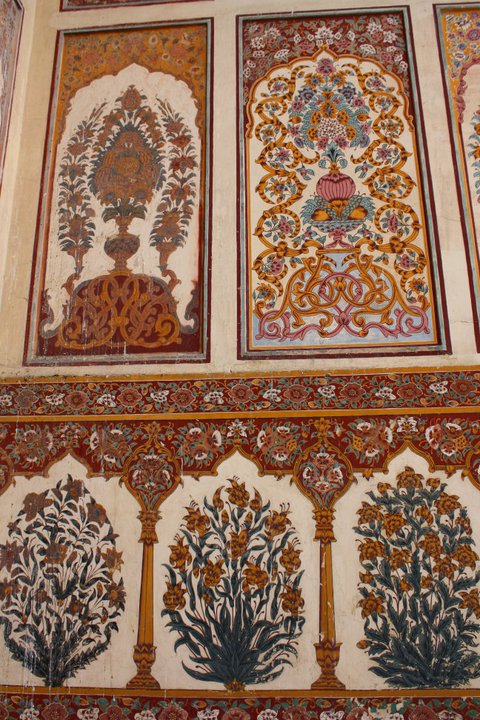
Top row: the domes. Bottom row: the elaborate internal decoration.

As a gateway to the west, and Persia in particular, Lahore had a strong regional style which was influenced by Persian architectural styles. Earlier mosques, such as the Wazir Khan Mosque, were adorned in intricate kashi-kari, or Kashan style tile work, from which the Badshahi Mosque would depart. Aurangzeb chose an architectural plan similar to that of Shah Jahan's choice for the Jama Masjid in Delhi, though he built the Badshahi Mosque on a much larger scale. Both mosques feature red sandstone with white marble inlay, which is a departure from typical mosque design in Lahore, in which decoration is done by means of intricate tile work.

=== Entryway of the complex ===
Entrance to the mosque complex is via a two-storey edifice built of red sandstone which is beautifully and elaborately decorated with framed and carved panelling on each of its facades. The edifice features a muqarna, an architectural feature from the Middle East that was first introduced into Mughal architecture with construction of the nearby and ornate Wazir Khan Mosque.

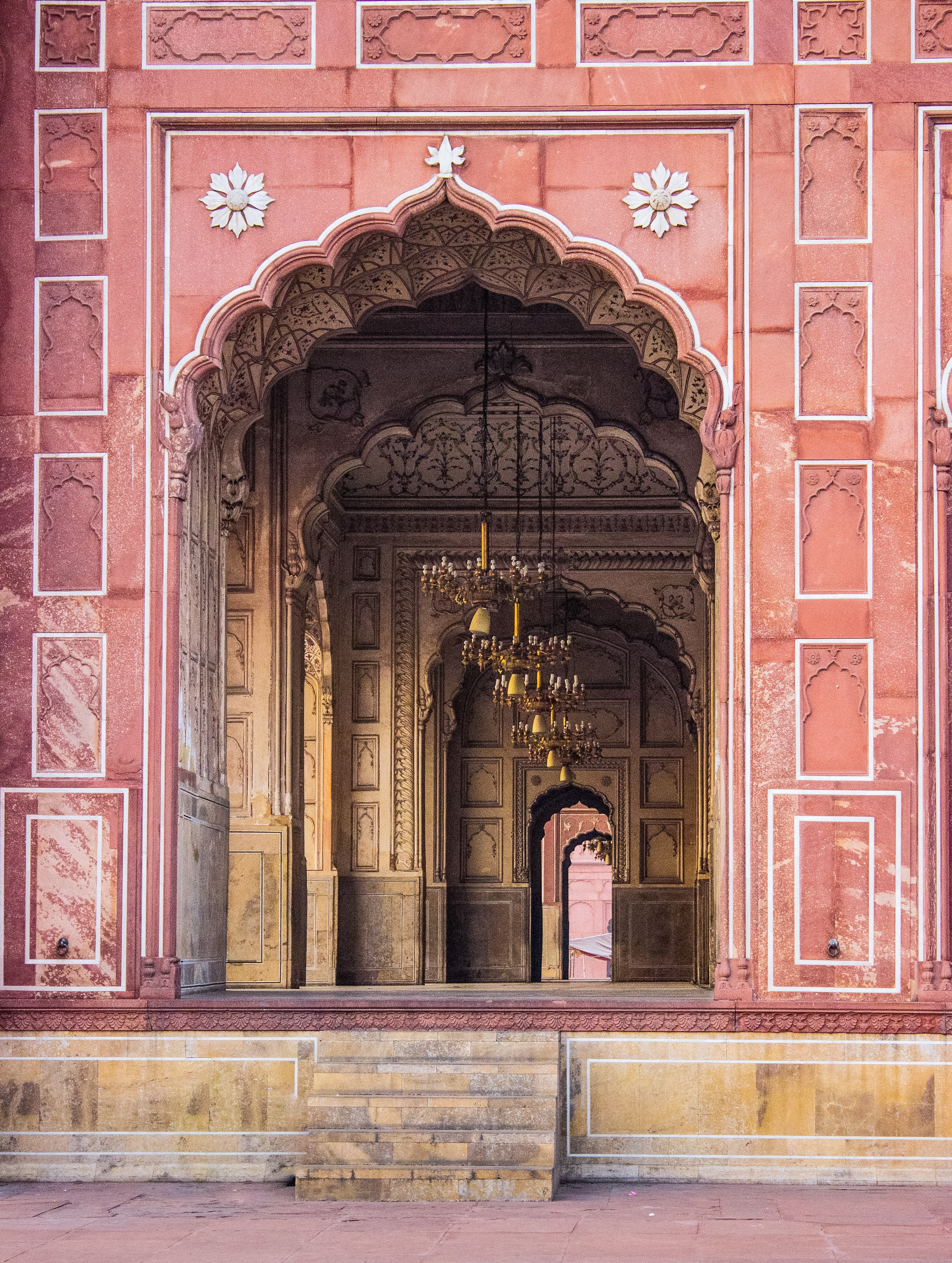
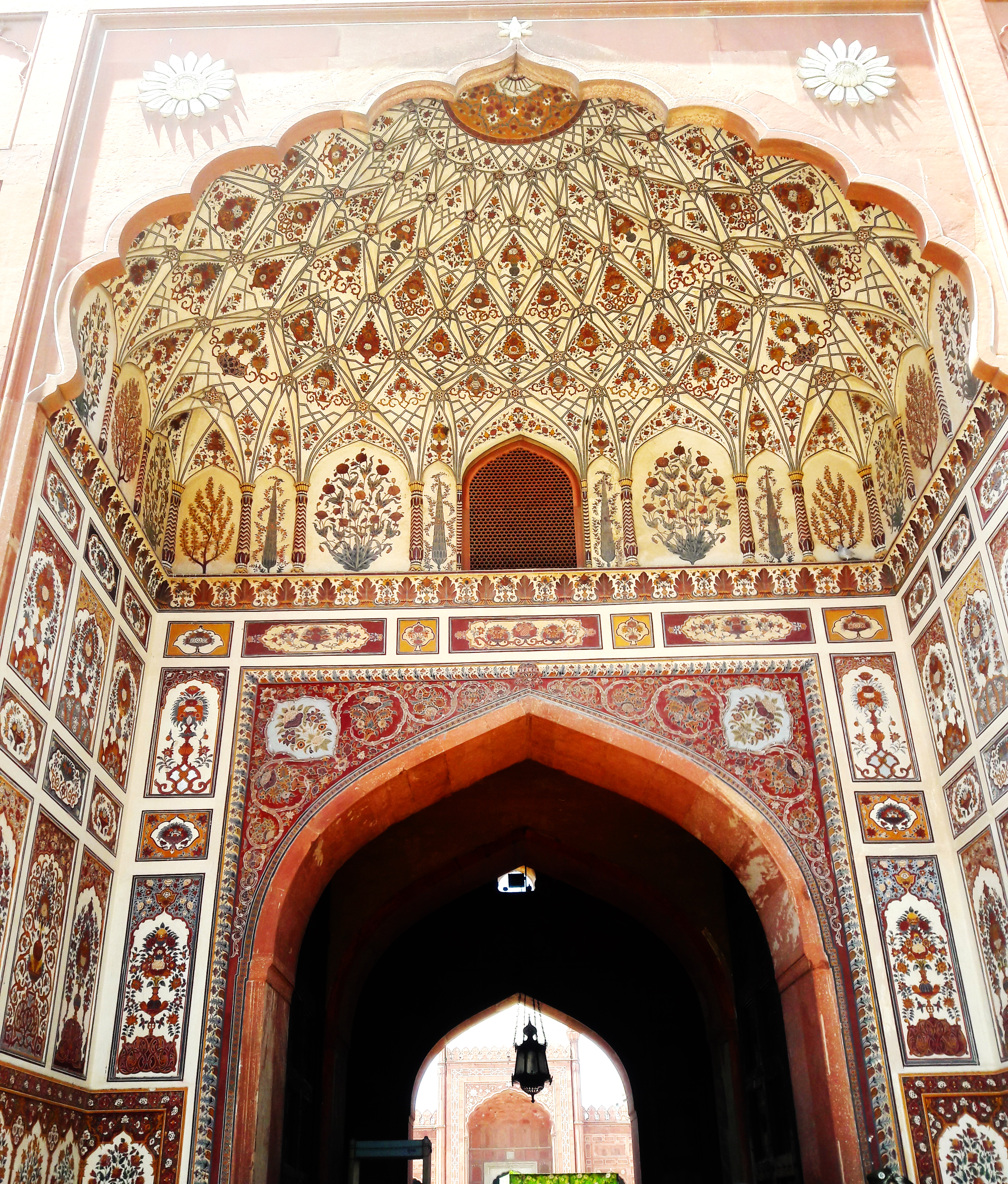
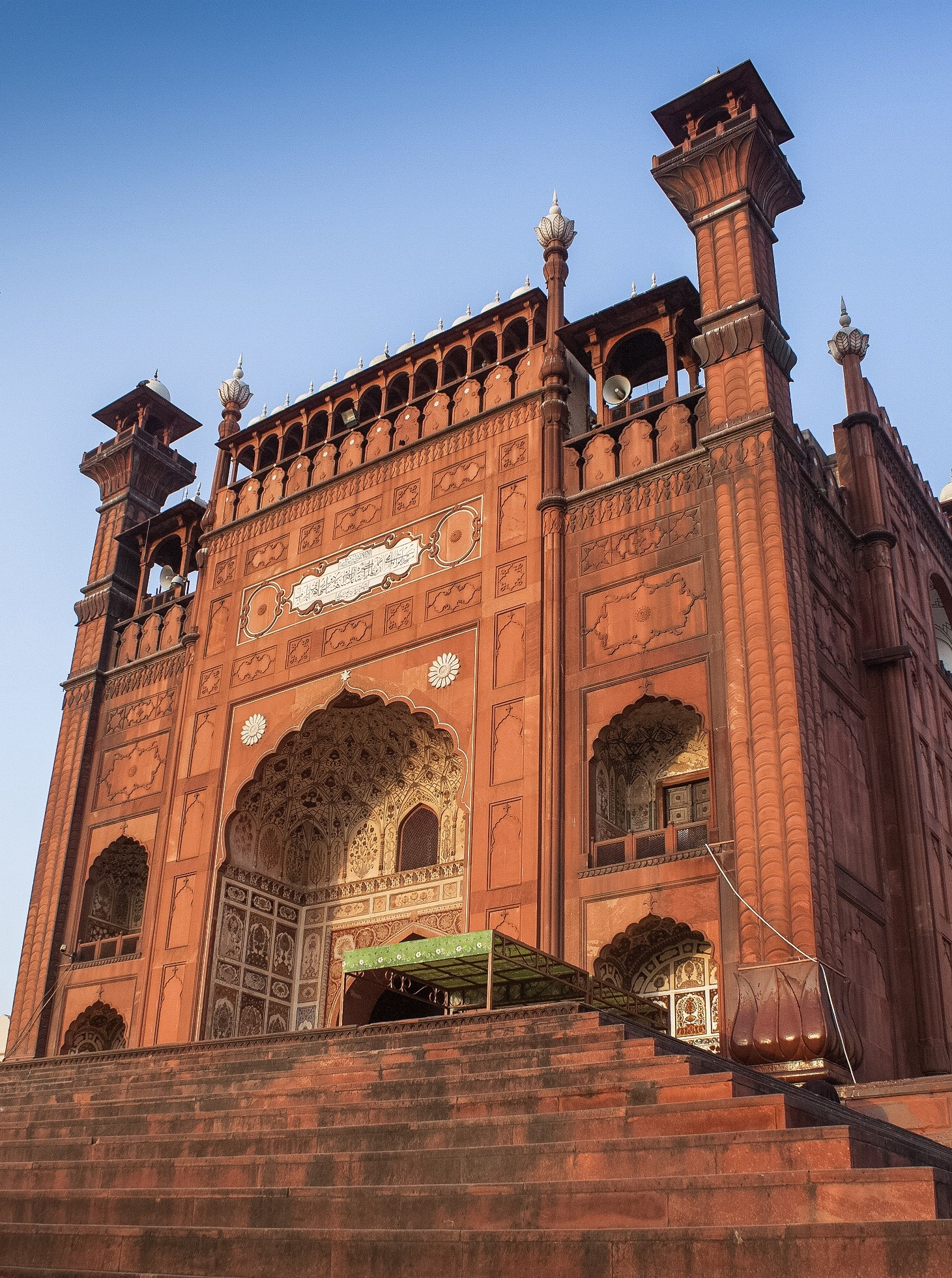
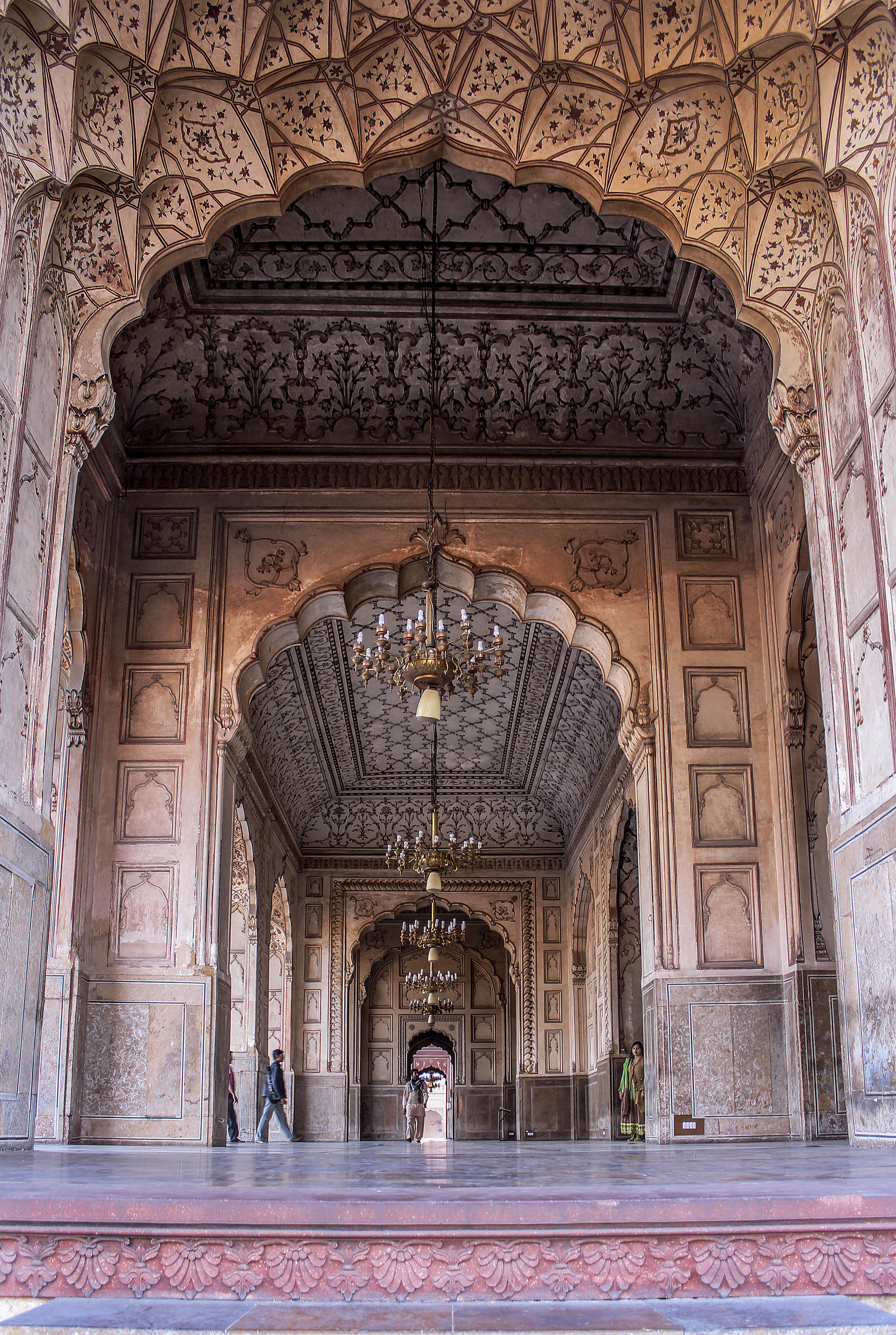
Various views of the mosque's monumental entrance arches, built on the orders of Akbar out of red sandstone

The mosque's full name "Masjid Abul Zafar Muhy-ud-Din Mohammad Alamgir Badshah Ghazi" is written in inlaid marble above the vaulted entrance. The mosque's gateway faces east towards the Alamgiri Gate of the Lahore Fort, which was also commissioned by Aurangzeb. The massive entrance and mosque are situated on a plinth, which is ascended by a flight of 22 steps at the mosque's main gate which. The gateway itself contains several chambers which are not accessible to the public.

=== Courtyard ===
After passing through the massive gate, an expansive sandstone paved courtyard spreads over an area of 25,600 square metres (276,000 ft^{2}), and which can accommodate 100,000 worshipers when functioning as an Idgah. The courtyard is enclosed by single-aisled arcades.

=== Prayer hall ===
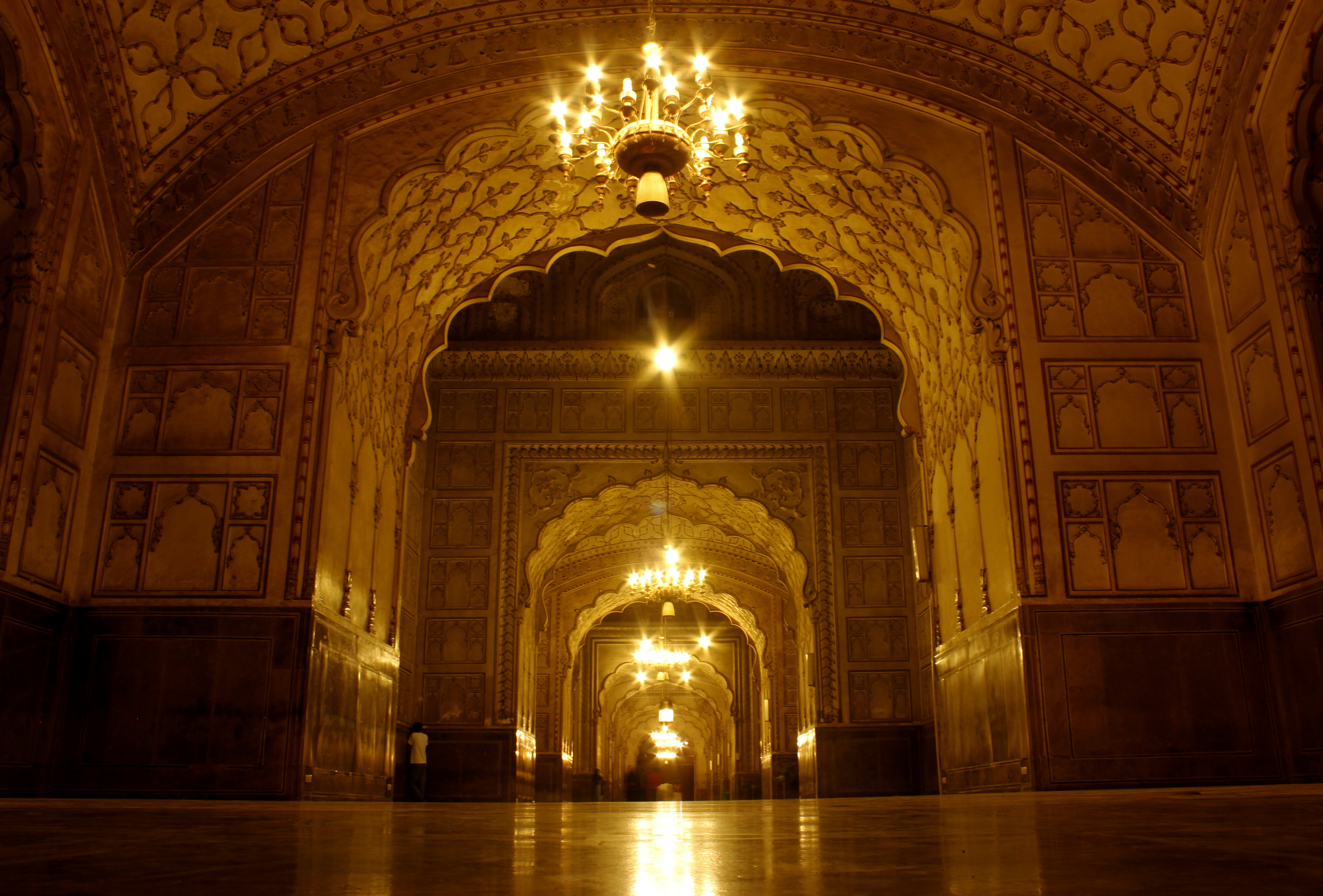
Main Prayer hall of Badshahi Mosque during night

The main edifice at the site was also built from red sandstone, and is decorated with white marble inlay. The prayer chamber has a central arched niche with five niches flanking it which are about one third the size of the central niche. The mosque has three marble domes, the largest of which is located in the centre of the mosque, and which is flanked by two smaller domes.

Both the interior and exterior of the mosque are decorated with elaborate white marble carved with a floral design common to Mughal art. The carvings at Badshahi Mosque are considered to be uniquely fine and unsurpassed works of Mughal architecture. The chambers on each side of the main chamber contains rooms which were used for religious instruction. The mosque can accommodate 10,000 worshippers in the prayer hall.

=== Minarets ===
At each of the four corners of the mosque, stands an octagonal, three-storey minaret made of red sandstone. Each minaret is 60 metres (196 ft) tall, with an outer circumference of 20 metres (67 ft) and the inner circumference of 2.6 metres (8.5 ft). Each minaret is topped by a marble canopy. The main building of the mosque also features an additional four smaller minarets at each corner of the building.

=== Relics' Chamber ===
The Relics' Gallery at Badshahi Mosque contains some 27 relics of Muhammad and his close associates, hosted there since 1885. Most of these relics were first obtained by Timur after his conquest of Damascus in 1401, with some being presented to him by an Ottoman delegation in 1402. The relics passed to his descendants, and with the establishment of the Mughal Empire in 1526 were carried away by Mughals, with whom they remained at Delhi for the next three centuries. In 1756, Ahmad Shah Abdali invaded Mughal Empire. During his return journey to Kandahar, Malika Zamani, his mother-in-law, also joined the entourage, taking with her the relics, but stopped at Jammu. There, the relics were bought from her by Shaikh Saundha, a descendant of Baba Farid, and Ghulam Muhammad Chattha, who divided the relics between themselves. The Chathas placed the relics at Rasulnagar, from where they were taken by the Sikhs when they occupied the town in 1783. The relics were moved first to Gujranwala and then to Batala, Mukerian and Chawinda, where they became a source of veneration for both Muslims and the Sikhs. In 1842, maharaja Sher Singh took them to the Lahore Fort where they remained until the British conquest of Punjab in 1849. In 1885, the relics were transferred to a gallery at Badshahi Mosque. In 2026, they were transferred to a newly built gallery at the mosque. The relics associated with Muhammad include a green turban, a cap, a green cloak, a robe, a pair of leather shoes, nishan mubarak (Islamic flag), a prayer mat, asa (a stick) and various items of clothing; they also contain several items associated with Ali, Fatima, Hassan and Hussain, Owais Qarni, Abdul Qadir Jilani, and other miscellaneous items.

=== Quran Gallery ===
The mosque's museum houses the Tabarrukat-e-Qur'an Gallery, which features a prominent display of the complete 30 Paras (sections) of the Holy Quran hand-stitched on cloth panels using gold and silver threads. The ten-year project (1966–1976) was produced and overseen by the artisans of the historic Taj Company under the direct administrative supervision of its General Manager, Mufti Khalil ur Rehman.

== See also ==
- Tourism in Punjab, Pakistan
- Architecture of Lahore
- Sheikh Zayed Grand Mosque in Abu Dhabi, whose design was partly inspired by the Badshahi Mosque
- Faisal Mosque

== Bibliography ==
=== Published sources ===
- Tillotson, G. H. R. (1990). Mughal India. Chronicle Books. ISBN 978-0-87701-686-1.
- Khan, Ahmad Nabi (1991). Development of Mosque Architecture in Pakistan. Lok Virsa Publishing House. ISBN 978-969-468-008-8.
- Asher, Catherine B. (1992). Architecture of Mughal India. Cambridge University Press. pp. 257–259. ISBN 978-0-521-26728-1.
- Grey, C. (1993). European Adventures of Northern India. Asian Educational Services. ISBN 978-81-206-0853-5.
- Tarin, Omer (1995). "Sir Sikandar Hyat Khan and the Renovation of the Badshahi Mosque, Lahore: An Historical Survey". Pakistan Historical Digest. 2 (4): 21–29.
- Tikekar, Maneesha (2004). Across the Wagah. Bibliophile South Asia. ISBN 978-81-85002-34-7.
- Welch, Anthony (2006). "Badshahi Mosque, Lahore". In Josef W., Meri (ed.). Medieval Islamic Civilization: An Encyclopedia. Routledge Encyclopedias of the Middle Ages. New York: Routledge. pp. 90–92. ISBN 978-0-415-96690-0.
- Scriver, Peter; Prakash, Vikramaditya (2007). Colonial Modernities: Building, Dwelling and Architecture in British India and Ceylon. Routledge. ISBN 978-1-134-15026-7.
- Din, Waheed Ud (2011). The Marching Bells: A Journey of a Life Time. Author House. ISBN 9781456744144.
- Lloyd, Nick (2011). The Amritsar Massacre: The Untold Story of One Fateful Day. I.B.Tauris. ISBN 978-0-7556-2571-0.
- Chida-Razvi, Mehreen (2020). "Lahore's Badshahi Masjid: Spatial Interactions of the Sacred and the Secular". In Uğurlu, A. Hilâl; Yalman, Suzan (eds.). The Friday Mosque in the City: Liminality, Ritual, and Politics. Intellect Books. ISBN 978-1-78938-304-1.
- Qasmi, Ali Usman (2023). Qaum, Mulk, Sultanat: Citizenship and National Belonging in Pakistan. Stanford University Press. ISBN 978-1-5036-3779-5.
- Hussain, Saddam; Juan, Fu (2023). "Exploring the Architecture and Its Influence of Badshahi Mosque Lahore (Bmlh): A Unesco Tentative Heritage Site". Journal of Islamic Architecture. 7 (3): 464–475. doi:10.18860/jia.v7i3.20999. ISSN 2356-4644.

=== Websites ===
- Timian, Alex (8 November 2011). "Badshahi Mosque". Atlas Obscura.
- "Badshahi Mosque (built 1672–74)". Asian Historical Architecture.
- "Badshahi Mosque, Lahore". UNESCO World Heritage Centre.
