= Moti Masjid (Lahore Fort) =

Marble mosque in Lahore Fort

Moti Mosque
- موتی مسجد
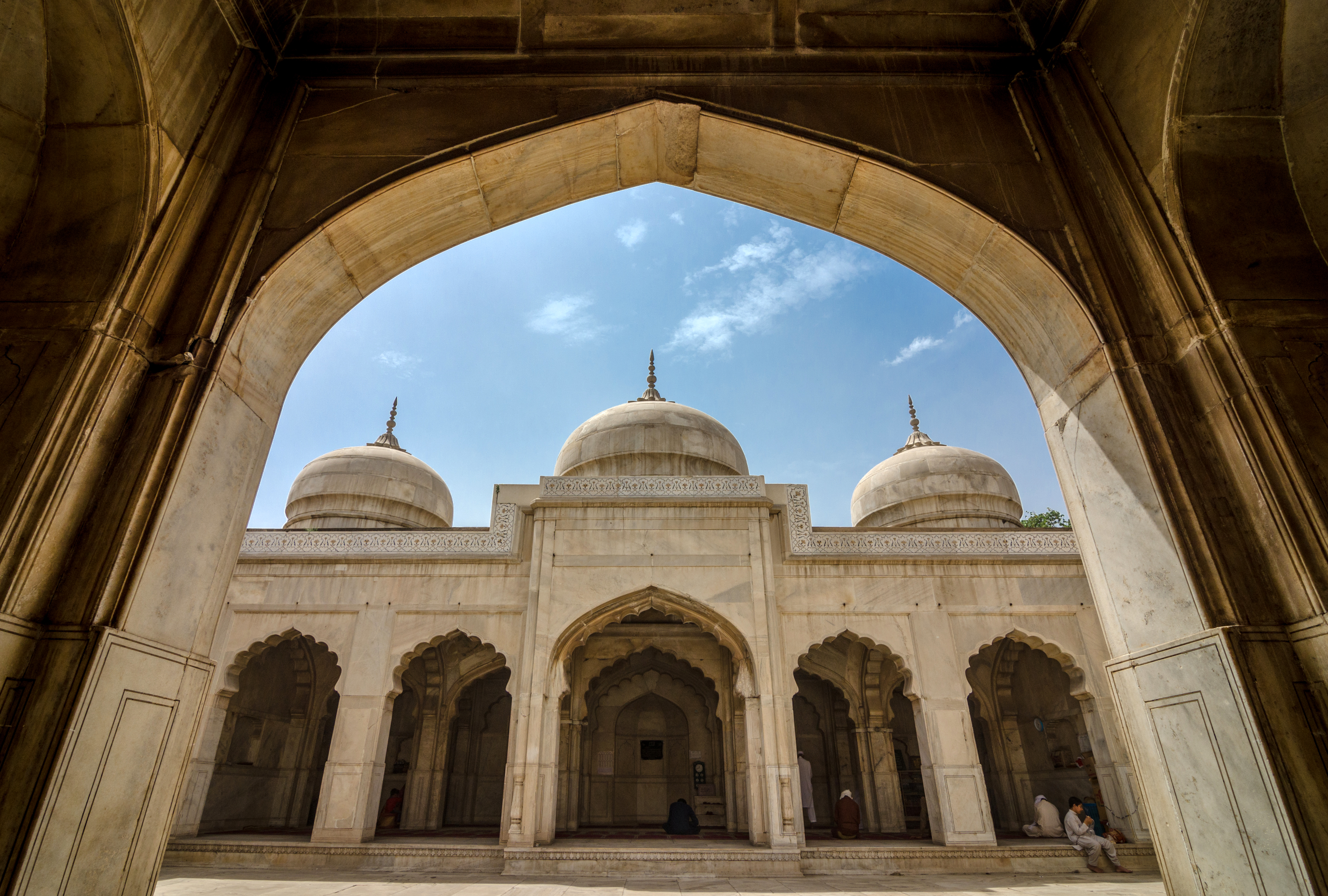

- Location within Lahore

Religion
- Affiliation: Islam
- Year consecrated: 1630

Location
- Location: Punjab, Lahore, Pakistan
- Coordinates: 31°35′18″N 74°18′50″E

Architecture
- Type: mosque
- Style: Mughal
- Completed: 1635; 391 years ago
- Dome: 3

Moti Masjid (Punjabi, Urdu: موتی مسجد), one of the "Pearl Mosques", is a 17th-century religious building located inside the Lahore Fort, Lahore, Punjab, Pakistan. It is a small, white marble structure built by Mughal emperor Shah Jahan and modified by the architects of Shah Jahan, and is among his prominent extensions (such as the Sheesh Mahal and the Naulakha pavilion) to the Lahore Fort Complex. The mosque is located on the western side of Lahore Fort, closer to Alamgiri Gate, the main entrance.

== Etymology ==
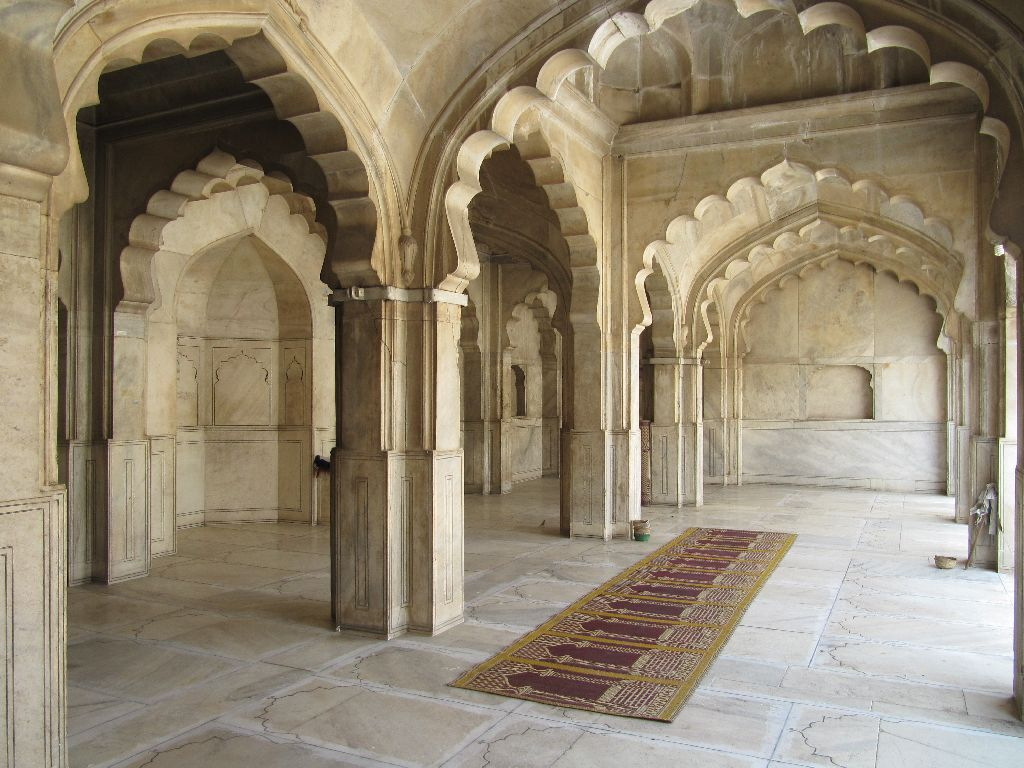
The mosque's white marble earned it the name "Pearl Mosque"

Moti in Urdu language means pearl, which designates a perceived preciousness to the religious structure. It was an established practice among Mughal emperors to name the mosques after generic names for gemstones. Other such examples are the Mina Masjid (Gem Mosque) and Nagina Masjid (Jewel Mosque), both located in Agra Fort and completed in 1637 during Shah Jahan's reign. The mosque, built between 1630 and 1635, is the first among the "pearl" named mosques. The others include the one built by Shah Jahan in Agra Fort (1647–53), and another by his son Aurangzeb in the Red Fort (1659–60).

== Subsequent history ==
After the Mughal Empire, the mosque was converted into a Sikh temple and renamed Moti Mandir during the period of the Sikh rule under Sikh Confederacy (1760–99). Later, Ranjit Singh also used the building for the state treasury. After the demise of Sikh Empire, when the British took over Punjab in 1849, they discovered precious stones wrapped in bits of rags and placed in velvet purses scattered inside the mosque, along with other inventory. The building was later revived to its former status, and the religious relics were conserved at the nearby Badshahi Mosque.

== Design ==
The structure, located in the northwestern corner of Dewan-e-Aam quadrangle, is typical of Mughal architecture of Shah Jahan's times. It is completely built of white marble that was brought from Makrana. The façade is composed of cusped arches and engaged baluster columns with smooth and fine contours. The mosque has three superimposed domes, two aisles of five bays, and a slightly raised central pishtaq, or portal with a rectangular frame. This five-arched facade distinguishes it from other mosques of the similar class with three-arched facades. The interior is simple and plain with the exception of ceilings that are decorated and designed in four different orders, two arcuate, and two trabeated.

== See also ==
- List of mosques in Pakistan
- Badshahi Mosque
- Naulakha pavilion
- Shalimar Gardens
- Sheesh Mahal
- Walled City of Lahore
