= List of mosques in Pakistan =

Being an Islamic country, Pakistan is home to thousands of mosques; the country's first economic survey found out that at the time of the 2023 census there were some 600,000 mosques in Pakistan. Some of the mosques are quite famous because of their size, beauty, architecture and history. The following is a list of mosques in Pakistan.

Name	Images	City	Capacity of worshipers	Area(m^{2})	Built	Remarks	References
Jamia Masjid Banbhore		Banbhore, Sindh			727 CE	Banbhore is an ancient city dating to the 1st century BCE located in Sindh, Pakistan. The eastern part of the city contains ruins of Banbhore Mosque with an inscription dating to 727 CE, sixteen years after the conquest of Sindh, indicating the best-preserved example of the earliest mosques in the region. Ruins are still preserved in the city. This is considered one of the oldest mosques in Pakistan.	
Chaqchan Mosque		Khaplu, Gilgit Baltistan	500		1370	The Kashmiri-style Chaqchan Mosque was built in 1370, shortly after the area’s conversion to Islam.	
Amburiq Mosque		Shigar, Gilgit Baltistan	500	63 m^{2} (680 sq ft)	14th Century	It is one of the oldest mosque in Baltistan and was built by Sayed Ali Hamdani. It is also one of the most famous landmarks and a major tourist attraction in Baltistan.	
Neevin Mosque		Lahore, Punjab	100		1460	Located in Walled City of Lahore, Neevin Mosque was built by Lodi dynasty under the rule of its first king Bahlul Lodi.	
Bhodesar Mosque		Tharparkar District, Sindh			1505	Built by Gujarati Sultan Mahmud Begada	
Shahi Mosque, Seetpur		Sitpur, Punjab			1530	Built by Tahir Khan Nahar	
Jamia Mosque, Bhera		Bhera, Punjab			1540	Built during the reign of Sher Shah Suri	
Begum Shahi Mosque		Lahore, Punjab		1,600 m^{2} (17,000 sq ft)	1614	Begum Shahi Mosque is an early 17th-century mosque situated in the Walled City of Lahore. The mosque was built between 1611 and 1614 during the reign of Mughal Emperor Jahangir in honor of his mother.	.
Dai Anga Mosque		Lahore, Punjab			1635 or 1639	Situated at the southeast of Lahore Railway Station, in the city of Lahore. The mosque is said to have been built in 1635 in honour of the wetnurse of the Mughal Emperor Shah Jahan, Dai Anga.	
Moti Masjid		Lahore, Punjab		160 m^{2} (1,700 sq ft)	1635	Moti Masjid is a 17th-century religious building located inside the Lahore Fort. It is a small, white marble structure built by Mughal emperor Jahangir, and is among his prominent extensions to the Lahore Fort Complex.	
Wazir Khan Mosque		Lahore, Punjab	10,000	3,825 m^{2} (41,170 sq ft)	1642	The mosque was commissioned during the reign of the Mughal Emperor Shah Jahan. Construction of Wazir Khan Mosque began in 1634 C.E. and was completed in 1641.	
Shahi Mosque, Chiniot		Chiniot, Punjab	1,200		1646–1655	Built by Hakim Saad-Ullah Khan	
Oonchi Mosque		Lahore, Punjab			N.A.	Mughal Era mosque located along the Hakiman Bazaar, near the Bhati Gate which leads into the Walled City of Lahore. Unlike other mosques in the Walled City of Lahore, no inscription exists which signifies the year of the mosque's construction.	
Shah Jahan Mosque		Thatta, Sindh	20,000	3,050 m^{2} (32,800 sq ft)	1647	Shah Jahan Mosque is a 17th-century building that serves as the jama masjid (congregational mosque) for the city of Thatta, Sindh. It was built during the reign of Mughal emperor Shah Jahan.	
Muhammad Saleh Kamboh Mosque		Lahore, Punjab			1659	Built by court history Muhammad Saleh Kamboh	
Mohabbat Khan Mosque		Peshawar, Khyber Pakhtunkhwa	14,000	2,800 m^{2} (30,000 sq ft)	1670s	Mohabbat Khan Mosque is a 17th-century Mughal-era mosque in Peshawar, Pakistan. The mosque was built between 1660 and 1670, and named after the Mughal governor of Peshawar, Nawab Mahabat Khan bin Ali Mardan Khan.	
Badshahi Mosque		Lahore, Punjab	100,000	25,642 m^{2} (276,010 sq ft)	1673	Second largest mosque in Pakistan and the fifth in the world; it was the largest mosque in the world from 1673 to 1986. The mosque is located west of Lahore Fort along the outskirts of the Walled City of Lahore, and is widely considered to be one of Lahore's most iconic landmarks.	
Jamia Mosque (Khudabad)		Dadu District, Sindh	5,000		1700 – 1718	The mosque is situated in Khudabad in Dadu District and was built during the reign of Yar Muhammad Kalhoro between 1700 and 1718.	
Shahi Eid Gah Mosque		Multan, Punjab		1,250 m^{2} (13,500 sq ft)	1735	Located on the main Multan-Lahore highway in the Northeast the city, the mosque is adjacent to the 20th century Sufi shrine of Ahmad Saeed Kazmi.	
Sunehri Mosque		Lahore, Punjab	5,000	25,948 m^{2} (279,300 sq ft)	1753	Sunehri Mosque is located in the Kashmiri Bazaar of the Walled City of Lahore. The mosque was built in 1753 when the Mughal Empire was in decline.	
Ali Muhammad Khan mosque		Multan, Punjab			1753	Built by Durrani governor Ali Mohammad Khakwani	
Abbasi Mosque		Bahawalpur, Punjab	1,000		1849	Built by Nawab Bahawal Khan located at Derawar Fort.	
Al-Sadiq Mosque, Bahawalpur		Bahawalpur, Punjab	6,000		19th century		
New Memon Masjid		Karachi, Sindh			1949		
CMH Masjid Jhelum		Jhelum Cantt, Punjab	25,000		1950	Located at Jhelum Cantt, the foundation of CMH Mosque was laid by General Muhammad Ayub Khan on March 21, 1950 and opening ceremony was headed by Governor of Punjab Sardar Abdur Rab Nishtar.	
Data Darbar		Lahore, Punjab	52,000	34,200 m^{2} (368,000 sq ft)	1978	Data Darbar, located in the city of Lahore, is the largest Sufi shrine in South Asia. It was built to house the remains of the Muslim mystic, Abul Hassan Ali Hujwiri, commonly known as Data Ganj Baksh.	
Bhong Mosque		Rahim Yar Khan District, Punjab			1982	Bhong Mosque was designed and constructed over a period of nearly 50 years (1932–1982) and won the Aga Khan Award for Architecture in 1986.	
Faisal Mosque		Islamabad	300,000	54,000 m^{2} (580,000 sq ft)	1986	Faisal Mosque is the national mosque of Pakistan and is named after Saudi King Faisal. Its prayer halls can hold 100,000 worshippers, while the surrounding porticoes and the courtyard up to 200,000 more.	
Faizan-e-Madinah		Karachi, Sindh	20,000	10,000 m^{2} (110,000 sq ft)	1999	A Mosque and education center run by Dawat-e-Islami. One of the largest mosques in Pakistan covering over 10,000 m^{2} with a capacity of over 20,000.	
Jamia Sakeena-Tul-Sughra		Muzaffargarh, Punjab			2007		
Grand Jamia Mosque, Karachi		Karachi, Sindh	800,000	202,343 m^{2} (2,178,000 sq ft)	2021	Grand Jamia Mosque, also known as Bahria Town Jamia Masjid Complex, is a cultural complex.	
Grand Mosque Allahabad		Naushahro Feroze District, Sindh	10,000	7,400 m^{2} (80,000 sq ft)	Under construction	Grand Mosque Allahabad is located in Kandiaro, Sindh.	
Grand Jamia Mosque, Lahore		Lahore, Punjab	100,000		2014	Seventh largest mosque in the world, and the largest in Pakistan in terms of surface area. It can accommodate 25,000 worshipers indoors, while the courtyard and corridor leading to the main halls of worship can accommodate a total of 70,000.	
Jamia Al-Kauthar		Islamabad	2,500		1990	Jamia Al-Kauthar Mosque is adjacent to the Shia seminary Al-Kauthar University. The iconic dome of this mosque is about 30 meters high from the ground level, and its 15 meters diameter makes the dome one of the largest in the country.	
Lal Masjid (Red Mosque)		Islamabad			1965	The Lal Masjid, also known as the Red Mosque, was built in 1965 and is named for its red walls and interiors. The mosque is one of the oldest mosques in Islamabad.	
Ilyasi Masjid		Abbottabad, Khyber Pakhtunkhwa			1932		
Qasim Ali Khan Mosque		Peshawar, Khyber Pakhtunkhwa				Qasim Ali Khan Mosque was built in 1842. There is a myth that the mosque was constructed during the Mughal era.	
Shahi Mosque, Chitral		Chitral, Khyber Pakhtunkhwa	20,000		1924	It was the principal mosque of Chitral at the time of the existence of the State of Chitral. The mosque was built by Shuja ul-Mulk in 1924.	
Tooba Mosque		Karachi, Sindh	5,000	3,280 m^{2} (35,300 sq ft)	1969	Masjid-e-Tooba was built in 1969 in Defence Housing Society, Karachi. It is often claimed to be the largest single-dome mosque in the world.	

== See also ==
- Lists of mosquesJamiah bilal mosque
