= Al-Kauthar Islamic University =

University in Islamabad, Pakistan

- Motto: إِنَّا أَعْطَيْنَاكَ الْكَوْثَرَ
- Motto in English: Verily, We have granted you Al-Kawthar
- Type: Islamic University
- Established: 2002
- Affiliations: Hoza Elmiya Najaf, Iraq
- Chancellor: Mohsin Ali Najafi
- Vice-Chancellor: Allama Anwar Ali Najafi
- Students: 2,000
- Location: Islamabad, Pakistan
- Knowledge is light

Al-Kauthar Islamic University (Urdu: جامعۃ الکوثر) is a Shia public, research university in Islamabad Capital Territory of Pakistan. It is located in Sector H-8/2 and was initially founded as the "Islamic University" in 2002. The university was named as “Alkauthar” at the name of Sura e Kauthar and in memory of Syeda Fatima Zahra SMA. The university has no affiliation or association with Al-Kawthar University located in Gulshan-e-Iqbal, Karachi.

== History ==
The foundation stone was laid in 1990 of a modern religious education center named “Jamia tu Al Kauthar”. In 2002 the Jamia started its academic activities. It is one of the largest Shiite educational institution in the sub-continent. At inception Jamia continued three basic Faculties, and will introduce new Faculties in the future.

== Admissions ==
Candidates for admission must have passed “Muqadimmat” from recognized Islamic institutes, with a minimum of 70% marks. The academic year runs for two semesters, from 1 August to 1 June, for 230 days with vacations in the academic year running for 135 days.

== Research and publications ==
- Dar ul Quran Al Karim

The aim is to propagate of true meanings of Quran for the natives of sub-continent. Translation of Quran Al Karim Number of editions printed 3 Many editions are printed by other publishers. Al Kauthar fi Tafseer ul Quran 2 out of 5 Volumes published. 3rd Volume will be published shortly.

== See also ==
- Jamia Al-Kauthar Mosque
- Al Kauthar fi Tafsir Al Quran
