= Nagina Masjid, Agra Fort =

Mosque in Agra India, Build by Mughal Emperor Shah Jahan

Nagina Mosque
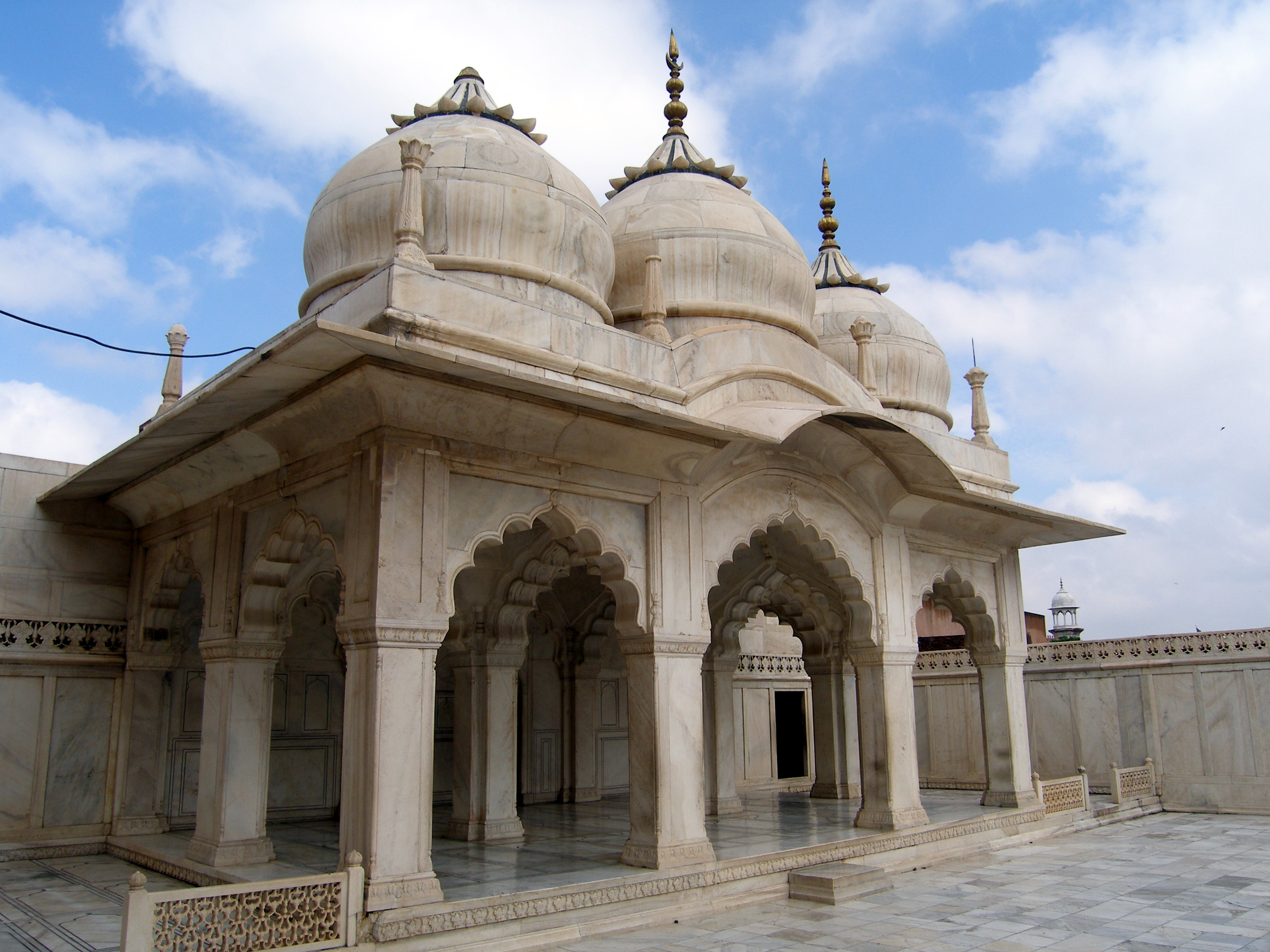
- The mosque in 2008

- Location of the mosque in Uttar Pradesh

Religion
- Affiliation: Sunni Islam
- Ecclesiastical or organizational status: Mosque
- Status: Active

Location
- Location: Agra Fort, Agra, Uttar Pradesh
- Country: India
- Interactive map of Nagina Mosque
- Administration: Archaeological Survey of India
- Coordinates: 27°10′46″N 78°01′21″E

Architecture
- Type: Mosque architecture
- Style: Mughal
- Founder: Shah Jahan
- Completed: c. 1631-1640 CE

Specifications
- Length: 7.39 m (24.2 ft)
- Width: 10.21 m (33.5 ft)
- Dome: Three
- Materials: Marble

Monument of National Importance
- Official name: Agra Fort: Nagina Masjid
- Part of: Agra Fort
- Reference no.: N-UP-A1-u

UNESCO World Heritage Site
- Official name: Agra Fort
- Criteria: Cultural: (iii)
- Reference: 251
- Inscription: 1984 (8th Session)
- Location of the mosque in Agra Fort

The Nagina Masjid, also known as the Gem Mosque and the Jewel Mosque, (Note: See Negin.) is a Sunni mosque, situated in the Agra Fort, a UNESCO World Heritage Site, located in Agra, in the state of Uttar Pradesh, India. The mosque was built by Shah Jahan, a Mughal leader, who succeeded Jahangir in 1628 CE and constructed three marble mosques inside the fort complex- the Moti Masjid, Nagina Masjid and Mina Masjid.

Nagina Masjid was made between 1631-1640 CE for Shah Jahan's personal use and the usage by the royal women.

It's one of the last structures constructed in the Agra Fort, as Shah Jahan moved the capital to Shahjahanabad (Old Delhi) in 1648 and Agra Fort stopped being the primary seat of power.

The mosque is a Monument of National Importance, administered by the Archaeological Survey of India.

== Architecture ==
The Nagina Masjid is an architectural beauty situated in Agra Fort. It is located nearby the Moti Masjid, another eye catching mosque, and the Mina Mosque.

The Nagina Mosque is constructed with attractive pure white marble and encloses the exquisitely designed prayer chamber. The Nagina Masjid bears a very simple architecture and a descent decoration. The mosque is separated into three bays by simple pillars underneath the keen arches above. The arch in the center is bigger and has nine cusps, once on either face has seven cusps only. The mosque is 10.21 metres (33.5 ft) wide and 7.39 metres (24.2 ft) long, facing a lined patio. The balcony that provides panoramic views of the road runs towards the Hathi Pol, and is situate on the northern side of the mosque.

The mosque structure was built for the ladies of the royal family and has three majestic domes and wonderful arches. A luxurious bazaar, known as Mina Bazar, was functioning down the road from where royal ladies could purchase items, standing on the balcony of the Nagina Masjid.

== Conservation and Current Status ==
Nagina Masjid in Agra Fort is listed as “a Centrally Protected Monument of national importance under the AMASR Act, 1958.” It was also inscribed as a UNESCO World Heritage Site in 1983.

== See also ==
- Sunni Islam in India
- List of mosques in India
- List of Monuments of National Importance in Agra district
