= List of Monuments of National Importance in Agra district =

The ASI has recognized 264 Monuments of National Importance in Agra circle of Uttar Pradesh. For technical reasons the Agra circle has to be split in two lists. The rest of Agra circle can be found in the list of Agra circle, except Agra district.

The Monuments listed here are within the city of Agra, its surroundings and Fatehpur Sikri.

== List of monuments ==
SL. No.	Description	Location	Address	District	Coordinates	Image
N-UP-A1	Agra Fort	Agra		Agra district	27°10′46″N 78°01′16″E	Agra Fort More images
N-UP-A1-a	Akbari Mahal	Agra Fort		Agra district	27°10′37″N 78°01′24″E	Akbari Mahal More images
N-UP-A1-b	Anguri Bagh	Agra Fort		Agra district	27°10′42″N 78°01′23″E	Anguri Bagh More images
N-UP-A1-c	Baoli of the Diwan-i-Am Quadrangle.	Agra Fort		Agra district	27°10′44″N 78°01′18″E	Baoli of the Diwan-i-Am Quadrangle. More images
N-UP-A1-d	Carved stone inscription dated A.D. 1605 inside the Delhi gate entrance.	Agra Fort		Agra district	27°10′50″N 78°01′05″E	Carved stone inscription dated A.D. 1605 inside the Delhi gate entrance. More images
N-UP-A1-e	Chittor Gates.	Agra Fort		Agra district	27°10′45″N 78°01′22″E	Chittor Gates. More images
N-UP-A1-f	Diwan-i-Am or Hall of Public Audience	Agra Fort		Agra district	27°10′44″N 78°01′21″E	Diwan-i-Am or Hall of Public Audience More images
N-UP-A1-g	Diwan-i-Khas or Private Hall of Audience	Agra Fort		Agra district	27°10′44″N 78°01′24″E	Diwan-i-Khas or Private Hall of Audience More images
N-UP-A1-h	Agra Fort: Galleries beneath the Khas Mahal	Agra Fort		Agra district	27°10′42″N 78°01′22″E	Agra Fort: Galleries beneath the Khas Mahal
N-UP-A1-i	Agra Fort: Hon'ble John Russell Colvin's Tomb.	Agra Fort		Agra district	27°10′44″N 78°01′20″E	Agra Fort: Hon'ble John Russell Colvin's Tomb. More images
N-UP-A1-j	Agra Fort: Inner Amar Singh Gate.	Agra Fort		Agra district	27°10′36″N 78°01′20″E	Agra Fort: Inner Amar Singh Gate. More images
N-UP-A1-k	Agra Fort: Inner Delhi Gate.	Agra Fort		Agra district	27°10′49″N 78°01′07″E	Agra Fort: Inner Delhi Gate. More images
N-UP-A1-l	Agra Fort: Jahangiri Mahal	Agra Fort		Agra district	27°10′40″N 78°01′23″E	Agra Fort: Jahangiri Mahal More images
N-UP-A1-m	Agra Fort: Jahangir's Bath	Agra Fort		Agra district	27°10′40″N 78°01′21″E	Agra Fort: Jahangir's Bath More images
N-UP-A1-n	Agra Fort: Khas Mahal or the Aramgah or private hall including the golden pavilions on each side.	Agra Fort		Agra district	27°10′42″N 78°01′25″E	Agra Fort: Khas Mahal or the Aramgah or private hall including the golden pavilions on each side. More images
N-UP-A1-o	Agra Fort: Ladies Bazaar attached to the Nagina Masjid.	Agra Fort		Agra district	27°10′45″N 78°01′22″E	Agra Fort: Ladies Bazaar attached to the Nagina Masjid. More images
N-UP-A1-p	Agra Fort: Machchi Bhawan or Fish House.	Agra Fort		Agra district	27°10′45″N 78°01′23″E	Agra Fort: Machchi Bhawan or Fish House. More images
N-UP-A1-q	Agra Fort: Raja Ratan Singh Jaat Ki Haveli impinging on the Nagina Masjid	Agra Fort		Agra district	27°10′46″N 78°01′22″E	Agra Fort: Raja Ratan Singh Jaat Ki Haveli impinging on the Nagina Masjid More images
N-UP-A1-r	Agra Fort: Mina Masjid	Agra Fort		Agra district	27°10′43″N 78°01′23″E	Agra Fort: Mina Masjid More images
N-UP-A1-s	Agra Fort: Moti Masjid or Pearl Mosque	Agra Fort		Agra district	27°10′49″N 78°01′18″E	Agra Fort: Moti Masjid or Pearl Mosque More images
N-UP-A1-t	Agra Fort: Royal Baths	Agra Fort		Agra district	27°10′46″N 78°01′24″E	Agra Fort: Royal Baths More images
N-UP-A1-u	Agra Fort: Nagina Masjid	Agra Fort		Agra district	27°10′46″N 78°01′21″E	Agra Fort: Nagina Masjid More images
N-UP-A1-v	Agra Fort: Salimgarh	Agra Fort		Agra district	27°10′42″N 78°01′17″E	Agra Fort: Salimgarh
N-UP-A1-w	Agra Fort: Musamman Burj with Pachisi Court and surrounding chambers.	Agra Fort		Agra district	27°10′44″N 78°01′25″E	Agra Fort: Musamman Burj with Pachisi Court and surrounding chambers. More images
N-UP-A1-x	Agra Fort: Shahjahan's apartment	Agra Fort		Agra district	27°10′44″N 78°01′25″E	Agra Fort: Shahjahan's apartment More images
N-UP-A1-y	Agra Fort: Shish Mahal	Agra Fort		Agra district	27°10′43″N 78°01′24″E	Agra Fort: Shish Mahal More images
N-UP-A1-z	Agra Fort: Somnath Gates	Agra Fort		Agra district	27°10′41″N 78°01′24″E	Agra Fort: Somnath Gates More images
N-UP-A1-aa	Agra Fort: Well (Baoli) in the Akbari Mahal.	Agra Fort		Agra district	27°10′37″N 78°01′25″E	Agra Fort: Well (Baoli) in the Akbari Mahal. More images
N-UP-A2	Barah Khamba together with adjoining area comprised in part of survey plot no. 150 as shown in the site plan.	Agra, Tajganj		Agra district	27°10′08″N 78°02′21″E	Upload Photo
N-UP-A3	Chattries on the Yamuna bank to the north of Ram Bagh	Agra		Agra district	27°12′28″N 78°02′15″E	Chattries on the Yamuna bank to the north of Ram Bagh
N-UP-A4	Chauburji, of the temporary Burial place of Emperor Babur, together with the Chabutra on which it stands.	Agra		Agra district	27°11′32″N 78°02′06″E	Chauburji, of the temporary Burial place of Emperor Babur, together with the Chabutra on which it stands. More images
N-UP-A5	Chini-ka-Rauza including well, tank and kiosk facing the river Yamuna.	Agra		Agra district	27°12′03″N 78°02′03″E	Chini-ka-Rauza including well, tank and kiosk facing the river Yamuna. More images
N-UP-A6	City wall on the west side of Agra Gate.	Agra		Agra district	27°11′04″N 77°59′58″E	Upload Photo
N-UP-A7	Dakhini darwaza in Mohalla Tajganj.	Agra	Kinari Bazar Rd, Kinari Bazar, Kaserat Bazar, Tajganj, Agra	Agra district	27°10′03″N 78°02′32″E	Upload Photo
N-UP-A8	Tomb of Firoz Khan	Agra		Agra district	27°08′16″N 78°00′07″E	Tomb of Firoz Khan More images
N-UP-A9	Gateway at Pul Changa Modi.	Agra		Agra district	27°11′16″N 77°59′30″E	Upload Photo
N-UP-A10	Gateway in the interior of Tajganj.	Agra	Katra Umar Khan, Kutta Parak, Kinari Bazar, Kaserat Bazar, Tajganj, Agra	Agra district	27°10′09″N 78°02′31″E	Upload Photo
N-UP-A11	Great Idgah.	Agra		Agra district	27°10′10″N 78°00′14″E	Great Idgah. More images
N-UP-A12	Itimad-ud-Daula's Tomb	Agra		Agra district	27°11′33″N 78°01′55″E	Itimad-ud-Daula's Tomb More images
N-UP-A13	Inscribed tablet in a piece of the old city wall of Agra (Akbarabad) on the west side of the Mahatma Gandhi road	Agra		Agra district	27°10′51″N 78°00′03″E	Upload Photo
N-UP-A14	Jami Masjid	Agra		Agra district	27°10′55″N 78°00′58″E	Jami Masjid More images
N-UP-A15	Jhun Jhun Katora	Agra		Agra district	27°12′28″N 78°00′04″E	Jhun Jhun Katora More images
N-UP-A16	Khans Gate	Agra		Agra district	27°11′04″N 77°59′59″E	Upload Photo
N-UP-A17	Kiosk and buildings other than the river side kiosk at or near Zohra Bagh.	Agra		Agra district	27°12′14″N 78°02′12″E	Upload Photo
N-UP-A18	Mehtab Bagh on the river bank, facing the Taj.	Agra		Agra district	27°10′48″N 78°02′31″E	Mehtab Bagh on the river bank, facing the Taj. More images
N-UP-A19	Maqbara called Kala Gumbaz between Chini-ka-Rauza and Bagh Wazir Khan.	Agra		Agra district	27°12′01″N 78°02′02″E	Upload Photo
N-UP-A20	Old Delhi Gate of city.	Agra		Agra district	27°11′47″N 77°59′54″E	Upload Photo
N-UP-A21	Pahlwan's Tomb near Cantonment, Gwalior Road	Agra		Agra district	27°08′21″N 78°00′48″E	Upload Photo
N-UP-A22	Ram Bagh Gateways	Agra		Agra district	27°12′17″N 78°02′24″E	Ram Bagh Gateways More images
N-UP-A23	Ram Bagh Houses, Kiosks, terraces and Katra.	Agra		Agra district	27°12′20″N 78°02′12″E	Ram Bagh Houses, Kiosks, terraces and Katra. More images
N-UP-A24	Rauza Diwanji Begum and Mosque	Agra		Agra district	27°09′49″N 78°02′52″E	Upload Photo
N-UP-A25	Sat Kuiya or Seven wells close by Ram Bagh on the Aligarh Road.	Agra		Agra district	27°12′39″N 78°02′18″E	Upload Photo
N-UP-A26	Small Chattri on Agra-Mathura Road.	Agra		Agra district	27°12′08″N 77°58′58″E	Upload Photo
N-UP-A27	Statue of Akbar's Horse on the Agra-Sikandara Road.	Agra		Agra district	27°12′35″N 77°57′58″E	Upload Photo
N-UP-A28	Taj Mahal and grounds including the Masjid on the west side, the pavilions on the east and west sides of the grounds	Agra		Agra district	27°10′31″N 78°02′32″E	Taj Mahal and grounds including the Masjid on the west side, the pavilions on the east and west sides of the grounds More images
N-UP-A28-a	Taj Mahal and grounds including the Masjid on the west side, the pavilions on the east and west sides of the grounds; great south entrance gateway and great courtyard surrounded by cloisters.	Agra		Agra district	27°10′31″N 78°02′32″E	Taj Mahal and grounds including the Masjid on the west side, the pavilions on the east and west sides of the grounds; great south entrance gateway and great courtyard surrounded by cloisters. More images
N-UP-A28-b	Taj Mahal and grounds: Dalans round Taj Quadrangle	Agra		Agra district	27°10′18″N 78°02′30″E	Taj Mahal and grounds: Dalans round Taj Quadrangle More images
N-UP-A28-c	Taj Mahal and grounds: Drinking fountain in the west enclosure wall of the Taj Garden.	Agra		Agra district	27°10′21″N 78°02′26″E	Upload Photo
N-UP-A28-e	Taj Mahal and grounds: Entrance Gateway of Khan-i-Alam Bagh	Agra		Agra district	27°10′24″N 78°02′26″E	Upload Photo
N-UP-A28-f	Taj Mahal and grounds: Fatehpur Masjid	Agra		Agra district	27°10′14″N 78°02′25″E	Taj Mahal and grounds: Fatehpur Masjid
N-UP-A28-g	Taj Mahal and grounds: Kali Masjid and enclosure wall.	Agra		Agra district	27°10′19″N 78°02′38″E	Taj Mahal and grounds: Kali Masjid and enclosure wall.
N-UP-A28-h	Taj Mahal and grounds: Khan-i-Alam Bagh together with the new tank near the Taj Mahal	Agra		Agra district	27°10′26″N 78°02′25″E	Taj Mahal and grounds: Khan-i-Alam Bagh together with the new tank near the Taj Mahal
N-UP-A28-i	Taj Mahal and grounds: Old Mughal Aqueduct.	Agra		Agra district	27°10′27″N 78°02′24″E	Upload Photo
N-UP-A28-j	Taj Mahal and grounds: Sahelion-ka-Gumbaz No.1 (Tomb of Fatehpuri Begum- Queen of Shahjahan)	Agra		Agra district	27°10′14″N 78°02′27″E	Taj Mahal and grounds: Sahelion-ka-Gumbaz No.1 (Tomb of Fatehpuri Begum- Queen of Shahjahan)
N-UP-A28-k	Taj Mahal and grounds: Sahelion-ka-Gumbaz No.2(Tomb of Sarhindi Begum- Queen of Shahjahan)	Agra		Agra district	27°10′15″N 78°02′36″E	Taj Mahal and grounds: Sahelion-ka-Gumbaz No.2(Tomb of Sarhindi Begum- Queen of Shahjahan)
N-UP-A28-l	Taj Mahal and grounds: Sahelion-ka-Gumbaz No.3 Satti-un-Nisa Mausoleum	Agra		Agra district	27°10′17″N 78°02′25″E	Taj Mahal and grounds: Sahelion-ka-Gumbaz No.3 Satti-un-Nisa Mausoleum More images
N-UP-A28-m	Taj Mahal and grounds: Sahelion-ka-Gumbaz No.4	Agra		Agra district	27°10′19″N 78°02′39″E	Taj Mahal and grounds: Sahelion-ka-Gumbaz No.4
N-UP-A28-n	Taj Mahal and grounds: Sirhi Darwaja facing the inner entrance gate of the Taj.	Agra		Agra district	27°10′14″N 78°02′32″E	Taj Mahal and grounds: Sirhi Darwaja facing the inner entrance gate of the Taj. More images
N-UP-A28-o	Taj Mahal and grounds: Tank near the Fatehpur Masjid	Agra		Agra district	27°10′15″N 78°02′25″E	Upload Photo
N-UP-A28-p	Taj Mahal and grounds: Well at the Taj garden	Agra		Agra district	27°10′24″N 78°02′29″E	Taj Mahal and grounds: Well at the Taj garden More images
N-UP-A29	Tank Pahlwan near Cantonment, Gwalior road.	Agra		Agra district	27°08′23″N 78°00′45″E	Upload Photo
N-UP-A30	Two Gateways of early Mughal date at the northeast and northwest corner of Rambagh.	Agra		Agra district	27°12′26″N 78°02′16″E	Upload Photo
N-UP-A31	Well and flight of steps in the Charbagh.	Agra		Agra district	27°10′46″N 78°02′02″E	Well and flight of steps in the Charbagh.
N-UP-A32	Zohra Bagh and River side Kiosk.	Agra		Agra district	27°12′07″N 78°02′04″E	Upload Photo
N-UP-A33	Kos Minar	Agra-Fatehpur Sikri Road, Mile 09, Furlong 04		Agra district	27°13′41″N 77°53′55″E	Kos Minar
N-UP-A34	Kos Minar	Agra-Fatehpur Sikri Road, Mile 11, Fag 01		Agra district	27°09′04″N 77°51′36″E	Kos Minar
N-UP-A35	Kos Minar	Agra-Fatehpur Sikri Road, Mile12, Furlong 07		Agra district	27°08′39″N 77°49′58″E	Kos Minar
N-UP-A36	Kos Minar	Agra-Fatehpur Sikri Road, Mile 15, Furlong 02		Agra district	27°08′20″N 77°47′46″E	Kos Minar
N-UP-A37	Kos Minar	Agra-Fatehpur Sikri Road, Mile 04, Furlong 03		Agra district	27°12′18″N 77°58′34″E	Upload Photo
N-UP-A38	Kos Minar	Agra-Mathura Road, Mile 06, Furlong 07		Agra district	27°13′03″N 77°56′18″E	Upload Photo
N-UP-A39	Kos Minar	Agra-Mathura Road, Mile-09, Furlong 04		Agra district	27°09′17″N 77°53′11″E	Upload Photo
N-UP-A40	Kos Minar	Agra-Mathura Road, Mile-126, Furlong 01		Agra district	27°14′10″N 77°51′29″E	Upload Photo
N-UP-A41	Tomb of Mahabat Khan's Daughter.	Bagh Rajpur Agra		Agra district	27°09′12″N 78°02′25″E	Upload Photo
N-UP-A42	Chattrie marking the site of the Empress Jodhbai's Tomb.	Bhogipura Agra		Agra district	27°10′01″N 77°58′59″E	Upload Photo
N-UP-A43	Double storied Mughal pavilion called Hajeera.	Burhia-ka-Tal		Agra district	27°13′56″N 78°11′04″E	Double storied Mughal pavilion called Hajeera.
N-UP-A44	The village known as Burhia-ka-Tal.	Burhia-ka-Tal		Agra district	27°14′02″N 78°11′07″E	Upload Photo
N-UP-A45-a	Fatehpur Sikri	Fatehpur Sikri		Agra district	27°05′48″N 77°39′57″E	Fatehpur Sikri
N-UP-A45-b	Fatehpur Sikri: Abul Fazl's House	Fatehpur Sikri		Agra district	27°05′44″N 77°39′48″E	Upload Photo
N-UP-A45-c	Fatehpur Sikri: Abul Faizi's House	Fatehpur Sikri		Agra district	27°05′44″N 77°39′47″E	Upload Photo
N-UP-A45-d	Fatehpur Sikri: Agra Gate.	Fatehpur Sikri		Agra district	27°06′06″N 77°40′34″E	Fatehpur Sikri: Agra Gate. More images
N-UP-A45-e	Fatehpur Sikri: Ajmer Gate.	Fatehpur Sikri		Agra district	27°05′22″N 77°39′00″E	Upload Photo
N-UP-A45-f	Fatehpur Sikri: Ankh Michauli and vaults beneath.	Fatehpur Sikri		Agra district	27°05′52″N 77°39′57″E	Fatehpur Sikri: Ankh Michauli and vaults beneath. More images
N-UP-A45-g	Fatehpur Sikri: Archways partly supporting platform by the water work and in front of covered way leading from Jodhbai's Palace towards the Hiran Minar.	Fatehpur Sikri		Agra district	27°05′50″N 77°39′53″E	Fatehpur Sikri: Archways partly supporting platform by the water work and in front of covered way leading from Jodhbai's Palace towards the Hiran Minar.
N-UP-A45-h	Fatehpur Sikri: Astrologer's Seat & vaults beneath	Fatehpur Sikri		Agra district	27°05′52″N 77°39′57″E	Fatehpur Sikri: Astrologer's Seat & vaults beneath More images
N-UP-A45-i	Fatehpur Sikri: Baha-ud-Din's Tomb.	Fatehpur Sikri		Agra district	27°05′06″N 77°39′17″E	Upload Photo
N-UP-A45-j	Buland Darwaza of the Jami Masjid	Fatehpur Sikri		Agra district	27°05′39″N 77°39′47″E	Buland Darwaza of the Jami Masjid More images
N-UP-A45-k	Fatehpur Sikri: Shah Quli Baoli on the north side of Agra road below Hakim's Bath.	Fatehpur Sikri		Agra district	27°05′44″N 77°40′03″E	Upload Photo
N-UP-A45-l	Fatehpur Sikri: Baradari near Kush Mahal.	Fatehpur Sikri		Agra district	27°05′29″N 77°38′53″E	Upload Photo
N-UP-A45-m	Fatehpur Sikri: Tansen's Baradari near Naubat Khana	Fatehpur Sikri		Agra district	27°06′01″N 77°40′13″E	Upload Photo
N-UP-A45-n	Fatehpur Sikri: Todarmal's Baradari near Tehra Darwaza	Fatehpur Sikri		Agra district	27°05′03″N 77°39′36″E	Upload Photo
N-UP-A45-o	Fatehpur Sikri: Birbal's Gate	Fatehpur Sikri		Agra district	27°05′46″N 77°40′44″E	Upload Photo
N-UP-A45-p	Fatehpur Sikri: Building commonly called Baiju-ka-Makan	Fatehpur Sikri		Agra district		Upload Photo
N-UP-A45-q	Fatehpur Sikri: Chandanpol Gate	Fatehpur Sikri		Agra district	27°05′33″N 77°40′34″E	Upload Photo
N-UP-A45-r	Fatehpur Sikri: Chor Darwaza	Fatehpur Sikri		Agra district		Upload Photo
N-UP-A45-s	Fatehpur Sikri: City Walls	Fatehpur Sikri		Agra district	27°06′11″N 77°40′34″E	Fatehpur Sikri: City Walls
N-UP-A45-t	Fatehpur Sikri: Cloisters in front of the hammam by the gate leading into the Diwani-i-Am courtyard.	Fatehpur Sikri		Agra district	27°05′48″N 77°40′02″E	Fatehpur Sikri: Cloisters in front of the hammam by the gate leading into the Diwani-i-Am courtyard.
N-UP-A45-u	Fatehpur Sikri: Daftarkhana (Old dak bungalow)	Fatehpur Sikri		Agra district	27°05′45″N 77°39′58″E	Fatehpur Sikri: Daftarkhana (Old dak bungalow) More images
N-UP-A45-v	Fatehpur Sikri: Dalan (attached to Mariam's House)	Fatehpur Sikri		Agra district	27°05′49″N 77°39′56″E	Fatehpur Sikri: Dalan (attached to Mariam's House) More images
N-UP-A45-w	[Fatehpur Sikri: Darogha's House	Fatehpur Sikri		Agra district	27°05′50″N 77°39′47″E	Upload Photo
N-UP-A45-x	Fatehpur Sikri: Delhi Gate	Fatehpur Sikri		Agra district	27°06′14″N 77°40′13″E	Upload Photo
N-UP-A45-y	Fatehpur Sikri: Diving well	Fatehpur Sikri		Agra district	27°05′39″N 77°39′44″E	Fatehpur Sikri: Diving well More images
N-UP-A45-z	Fatehpur Sikri: Diwan-i-Khas with cloisters	Fatehpur Sikri		Agra district	27°05′52″N 77°39′58″E	Fatehpur Sikri: Diwan-i-Khas with cloisters More images
N-UP-A45-aa	Fatehpur Sikri: Domed Baths	Fatehpur Sikri		Agra district		Fatehpur Sikri: Domed Baths
N-UP-A45-ab	Fatehpur Sikri: Domed Gateway on the stone ridge by the Agra Gate	Fatehpur Sikri		Agra district		Upload Photo
N-UP-A45-ac	Fatehpur Sikri: Elephant Gate or Hathi Pol	Fatehpur Sikri		Agra district	27°05′51″N 77°39′50″E	Fatehpur Sikri: Elephant Gate or Hathi Pol More images
N-UP-A45-ad	Fatehpur Sikri: Girls' School	Fatehpur Sikri		Agra district	27°05′50″N 77°39′57″E	Fatehpur Sikri: Girls' School More images
N-UP-A45-ae	Fatehpur Sikri: Guard House attached to Jodh Bai's Palace	Fatehpur Sikri		Agra district	27°05′47″N 77°39′55″E	Fatehpur Sikri: Guard House attached to Jodh Bai's Palace More images
N-UP-A45-af	Fatehpur Sikri: Guard House (attached to Mariam's House)	Fatehpur Sikri		Agra district	27°05′49″N 77°39′57″E	Upload Photo
N-UP-A45-ag	Fatehpur Sikri: Guard House	Fatehpur Sikri		Agra district		Upload Photo
N-UP-A45-ah	Fatehpur Sikri: Guard House at the foot of the ridge by Agra gate	Fatehpur Sikri		Agra district	27°06′07″N 77°40′34″E	Upload Photo
N-UP-A45-ai	Fatehpur Sikri: Gwalior Gate	Fatehpur Sikri		Agra district	27°05′08″N 77°39′54″E	Fatehpur Sikri: Gwalior Gate More images
N-UP-A45-aj	Fatehpur Sikri: Hakim's Bath	Fatehpur Sikri		Agra district	27°05′47″N 77°40′02″E	Upload Photo
N-UP-A45-ak	Fatehpur Sikri: Hakim's (Doctor's ) house	Fatehpur Sikri		Agra district	27°05′48″N 77°40′02″E	Upload Photo
N-UP-A45-al	Fatehpur Sikri: Hamamm, southeast of Buland Darwaza	Fatehpur Sikri		Agra district		Upload Photo
N-UP-A45-am	Fatehpur Sikri: Hamamm, in front of the Buland Darwaza	Fatehpur Sikri		Agra district	27°05′35″N 77°39′47″E	Fatehpur Sikri: Hamamm, in front of the Buland Darwaza More images
N-UP-A45-an	Fatehpur Sikri: Hammam (attached to Jodh Bai's Palace)	Fatehpur Sikri		Agra district	27°05′46″N 77°39′53″E	Upload Photo
N-UP-A45-ao	Fatehpur Sikri: Hammam, No. 2	Fatehpur Sikri		Agra district		Upload Photo
N-UP-A45-ap	Fatehpur Sikri: Hammam, No. 3	Fatehpur Sikri		Agra district		Upload Photo
N-UP-A45-aq	Fatehpur Sikri: Hammam outside Abul Fazl's House	Fatehpur Sikri		Agra district	27°05′44″N 77°39′48″E	Upload Photo
N-UP-A45-ar	Fatehpur Sikri: Hawa Mahal (at Jodh Bai's Palace)	Fatehpur Sikri		Agra district	27°05′49″N 77°39′54″E	Fatehpur Sikri: Hawa Mahal (at Jodh Bai's Palace)
N-UP-A45-as	Fatehpur Sikri: Hiran Minar	Fatehpur Sikri		Agra district	27°05′55″N 77°39′45″E	Fatehpur Sikri: Hiran Minar More images
N-UP-A45-at	Fatehpur Sikri: Horse stables, Camel stables &Hammam	Fatehpur Sikri		Agra district	27°05′47″N 77°39′51″E	Fatehpur Sikri: Horse stables, Camel stables &Hammam More images
N-UP-A45-au	Fatehpur Sikri: Hospital at the corner of Birbal's House	Fatehpur Sikri		Agra district	27°05′49″N 77°39′51″E	Fatehpur Sikri: Hospital at the corner of Birbal's House More images
N-UP-A45-av	Fatehpur Sikri: Hospital and latrine	Fatehpur Sikri		Agra district		Upload Photo
N-UP-A45-aw	Fatehpur Sikri: Jami Masjid (Dargah)	Fatehpur Sikri		Agra district	27°05′41″N 77°39′44″E	Fatehpur Sikri: Jami Masjid (Dargah) More images
N-UP-A45-ax	Fatehpur Sikri: Jodh Bai's Palace	Fatehpur Sikri		Agra district	27°05′48″N 77°39′54″E	Fatehpur Sikri: Jodh Bai's Palace More images
N-UP-A45-ay	Fatehpur Sikri: Karwan buildings above the Karwan Sarai	Fatehpur Sikri		Agra district	27°05′51″N 77°39′47″E	Fatehpur Sikri: Karwan buildings above the Karwan Sarai
N-UP-A45-az	Fatehpur Sikri: Karwan Sarai	Fatehpur Sikri		Agra district	27°05′51″N 77°39′46″E	Fatehpur Sikri: Karwan Sarai
N-UP-A45-ba	Fatehpur Sikri: Khanqah	Fatehpur Sikri		Agra district		Upload Photo
N-UP-A45-bb	Fatehpur Sikri: Khanqah attached to Dargah Jami Masjid	Fatehpur Sikri		Agra district	27°05′43″N 77°39′47″E	Fatehpur Sikri: Khanqah attached to Dargah Jami Masjid More images
N-UP-A45-bc	Fatehpur Sikri: Khas Mahal cloisters	Fatehpur Sikri		Agra district	27°05′48″N 77°39′59″E	Fatehpur Sikri: Khas Mahal cloisters More images
N-UP-A45-bd	Fatehpur Sikri: Khatai Khana	Fatehpur Sikri		Agra district		Upload Photo
N-UP-A45-be	Fatehpur Sikri: Khush Mahal or "Hada Mahal"	Fatehpur Sikri		Agra district	27°05′29″N 77°38′56″E	Upload Photo
N-UP-A45-bf	Fatehpur Sikri: Khwabagh (Khas-Mahal)	Fatehpur Sikri		Agra district	27°05′48″N 77°39′58″E	Fatehpur Sikri: Khwabagh (Khas-Mahal)
N-UP-A45-bg	Fatehpur Sikri: King's Gate of the Jami Masjid	Fatehpur Sikri		Agra district	27°05′41″N 77°39′49″E	Fatehpur Sikri: King's Gate of the Jami Masjid More images
N-UP-A45-bh	Fatehpur Sikri: Kitchen (attached to Mariam's Houses	Fatehpur Sikri		Agra district	27°05′48″N 77°39′56″E	Fatehpur Sikri: Kitchen (attached to Mariam's Houses More images
N-UP-A45-bi	Fatehpur Sikri: Lal Darwaza	Fatehpur Sikri		Agra district	27°06′16″N 77°40′32″E	Upload Photo
N-UP-A45-bj	Fatehpur Sikri: Mariam's House	Fatehpur Sikri		Agra district	27°05′49″N 77°39′56″E	Fatehpur Sikri: Mariam's House More images
N-UP-A45-bk	Fatehpur Sikri: Mint	Fatehpur Sikri		Agra district	27°05′55″N 77°40′04″E	Upload Photo
N-UP-A45-bl	Fatehpur Sikri: Nagina Masjid	Fatehpur Sikri		Agra district	27°05′50″N 77°39′53″E	Upload Photo
N-UP-A45-bm	Fatehpur Sikri: North Gate commonly known as Zanana Rauza of the Jami Masjid	Fatehpur Sikri		Agra district	27°05′43″N 77°39′46″E	Fatehpur Sikri: North Gate commonly known as Zanana Rauza of the Jami Masjid More images
N-UP-A45-bn	Fatehpur Sikri: Octagonal Baoli	Fatehpur Sikri		Agra district	27°05′53″N 77°39′50″E	Upload Photo
N-UP-A45-bo	Fatehpur Sikri: Pachisi Court with Dalans	Fatehpur Sikri		Agra district	27°05′50″N 77°39′57″E	Fatehpur Sikri: Pachisi Court with Dalans More images
N-UP-A45-bp	Fatehpur Sikri: Panch Mahal	Fatehpur Sikri		Agra district	27°05′50″N 77°39′56″E	Fatehpur Sikri: Panch Mahal More images
N-UP-A45-bq	Fatehpur Sikri: Pigeon house	Fatehpur Sikri		Agra district	27°05′50″N 77°39′50″E	Upload Photo
N-UP-A45-br	Fatehpur Sikri: Poor house on the southeast angle of Jami Masjid	Fatehpur Sikri		Agra district	27°05′39″N 77°39′48″E	Fatehpur Sikri: Poor house on the southeast angle of Jami Masjid More images
N-UP-A45-bs	Fatehpur Sikri: Ranges of building between Diwan-i-Am and the Treasury including a Hammam	Fatehpur Sikri		Agra district	27°05′50″N 77°40′03″E	Upload Photo
N-UP-A45-bt	Fatehpur Sikri: Poor house (attached to Nagina Masjid)	Fatehpur Sikri		Agra district		Upload Photo
N-UP-A45-bu	Fatehpur Sikri: Rang Mahal	Fatehpur Sikri		Agra district	27°05′50″N 77°40′03″E	Fatehpur Sikri: Rang Mahal
N-UP-A45-bv	Fatehpur Sikri: Ruined Bath, east of the Octagonal Baol	Fatehpur Sikri		Agra district	27°05′56″N 77°39′50″E	Upload Photo
N-UP-A45-bw	Fatehpur Sikri: Salim Chishti's Tomb	Fatehpur Sikri		Agra district	27°05′42″N 77°39′46″E	Fatehpur Sikri: Salim Chishti's Tomb More images
N-UP-A45-bx	Fatehpur Sikri: Samosa Mahal, north of Abul Fazl's House	Fatehpur Sikri		Agra district	27°05′46″N 77°39′46″E	Upload Photo
N-UP-A45-by	Fatehpur Sikri: Sangin Burj	Fatehpur Sikri		Agra district	27°05′51″N 77°39′49″E	Upload Photo
N-UP-A45-bz	Fatehpur Sikri: Small Baths, north of Abul Fazl's house	Fatehpur Sikri		Agra district	27°05′46″N 77°39′49″E	Fatehpur Sikri: Small Baths, north of Abul Fazl's house
N-UP-A45-ca	Fatehpur Sikri: Small Masjid attached to Baha-ud-din's Tomb	Fatehpur Sikri		Agra district	27°05′06″N 77°39′17″E	Upload Photo
N-UP-A45-cb	Fatehpur Sikri: Small Masjid between Delhi Gate & Lal Darwaza	Fatehpur Sikri		Agra district		Upload Photo
N-UP-A45-cc	Fatehpur Sikri: Stone Cutter's Masjid	Fatehpur Sikri		Agra district	27°05′39″N 77°39′34″E	Upload Photo
N-UP-A45-cd	Fatehpur Sikri: Sukh Tal	Fatehpur Sikri		Agra district	27°05′46″N 77°40′01″E	Upload Photo
N-UP-A45-ce	Fatehpur Sikri: Sweet Tank at the back of Diwan-i-Khas	Fatehpur Sikri		Agra district	27°05′54″N 77°39′58″E	Fatehpur Sikri: Sweet Tank at the back of Diwan-i-Khas More images
N-UP-A45-cf	Fatehpur Sikri: Tomb of Islam Khan	Fatehpur Sikri		Agra district	27°05′43″N 77°39′47″E	Fatehpur Sikri: Tomb of Islam Khan More images
N-UP-A45-cg	Fatehpur Sikri: Treasury and Naubat Khana	Agra		Agra district	27°05′52″N 77°40′06″E	Upload Photo
N-UP-A45-ch	Fatehpur Sikri: Turkish Sultana's House and Hammam	Fatehpur Sikri		Agra district	27°05′49″N 77°39′59″E	Fatehpur Sikri: Turkish Sultana's House and Hammam
N-UP-A45-ci	Fatehpur Sikri: Viaduct across the road leading to Bharatpur	Fatehpur Sikri		Agra district	27°06′46″N 77°39′46″E	Upload Photo
N-UP-A45-cj	Fatehpur Sikri: Viaduct across the road leading to Bharatpur	Fatehpur Sikri		Agra district		Upload Photo
N-UP-A45-ck	Fatehpur Sikri: Viaduct across the road leading to Bharatpur	Fatehpur Sikri		Agra district		Upload Photo
N-UP-A45-cl	Fatehpur Sikri: Well by Hiran Minar	Fatehpur Sikri		Agra district	27°05′56″N 77°39′45″E	Upload Photo
N-UP-A46	Tomb of Sadiq Khan	Gelana		Agra district	27°12′39″N 77°58′40″E	Tomb of Sadiq Khan
N-UP-A47	Tomb of Salabat Khan	Gelana		Agra district	27°12′40″N 77°58′37″E	Tomb of Salabat Khan
N-UP-A48	Dhakri-ka-Mahal	Gopalpura		Agra district	27°11′15″N 77°58′18″E	Upload Photo
N-UP-A49	Jami Masjid	Itimadpur		Agra district	27°14′03″N 78°12′02″E	Upload Photo
N-UP-A50	Jagner Fort including the Gwal Baba Temple with the Stairway leading there to and the baoli outside and below the main gate on the hill of Jagner.	Jagner		Agra district	26°51′36″N 77°35′59″E	Jagner Fort including the Gwal Baba Temple with the Stairway leading there to and the baoli outside and below the main gate on the hill of Jagner.
N-UP-A51	Two gateways and the Mosque in the Jajau Sarai.	Jajau		Agra district	26°54′59″N 77°55′25″E	Upload Photo
N-UP-A52	Humayun Masjid	Kachhpura Agra	Nagla Devjit	Agra district	27°10′57″N 78°02′22″E	Upload Photo
N-UP-A53	Bara Khamba	Kagarol Agra		Agra district	27°01′30″N 77°50′46″E	Upload Photo
N-UP-A54	Guru-ka-Tal	Kakretha Agra		Agra district	27°12′45″N 77°57′58″E	Guru-ka-Tal More images
N-UP-A55	Fifty-two bullock well	Khawaspur		Agra district	27°09′23″N 77°59′01″E	Upload Photo
N-UP-A56	Kamal Khan's Dargah	Khawaspur		Agra district	27°09′22″N 77°59′02″E	Upload Photo
N-UP-A57	Old Tila and Tasu Tila	Khawaspur		Agra district	26°56′41″N 77°49′17″E	Upload Photo
N-UP-A58	Roman Catholic Cemetery with all its tombs, Boundary Walls, gateways and gardens	Lashkarpur and Sadi-ka-Nagla Agra		Agra district	27°12′35″N 78°00′18″E	Upload Photo
N-UP-A59	Mass of rubble and concrete said to contain tombs of Ladli Begum and her two brothers Faizi and Abul Fazl	Mau Agra		Agra district	27°12′48″N 77°59′22″E	Upload Photo
N-UP-A60	Itibari Khan's Mosque	Near SikandaraAgra		Agra district	27°12′34″N 77°57′59″E	Upload Photo
N-UP-A61	Jaswant Singh-ki-Chattri	Rajwara Agra		Agra district	27°12′52″N 78°02′02″E	Jaswant Singh-ki-Chattri More images
N-UP-A62	Tomb of Sheikh Ibrahim (Nephew of Salim Chishti)	Rasulpur		Agra district	27°07′02″N 77°38′22″E	Upload Photo
N-UP-A63	Akbar's Tomb, gateway and walls round the ground.	SikandaraAgra		Agra district	27°13′14″N 77°57′02″E	Akbar's Tomb, gateway and walls round the ground. More images
N-UP-A64	Dalans on the east and south sides of the great south gate and domed structure on the west side of the same gate.	SikandaraAgra		Agra district	27°13′03″N 77°57′01″E	Dalans on the east and south sides of the great south gate and domed structure on the west side of the same gate. More images
N-UP-A65	Kanch Mahal, at the southeast corner of Akbar's Tomb	SikandaraAgra		Agra district	27°12′59″N 77°57′09″E	Kanch Mahal, at the southeast corner of Akbar's Tomb More images
N-UP-A66	Mariam's Tomb	SikandaraAgra		Agra district	27°12′55″N 77°56′34″E	Mariam's Tomb More images
N-UP-A67	Small mosque situated in the Church Missionary Society's compound	SikandaraAgra		Agra district	27°12′51″N 77°57′35″E	Upload Photo

== See also ==
- List of Monuments of National Importance in Sarnath circle, Uttar Pradesh
- List of Monuments of National Importance in Lalitpur district
- List of Monuments of National Importance in Lucknow circle/North
- List of Monuments of National Importance in Lucknow circle/South
- List of Monuments of National Importance in India for other Monuments of National Importance in India
- List of State Protected Monuments in Uttar Pradesh
