= Jamia Masjid, Banbhore =

Mosque ruin in Sindh, Pakistan

Jamia Masjid Banbhore
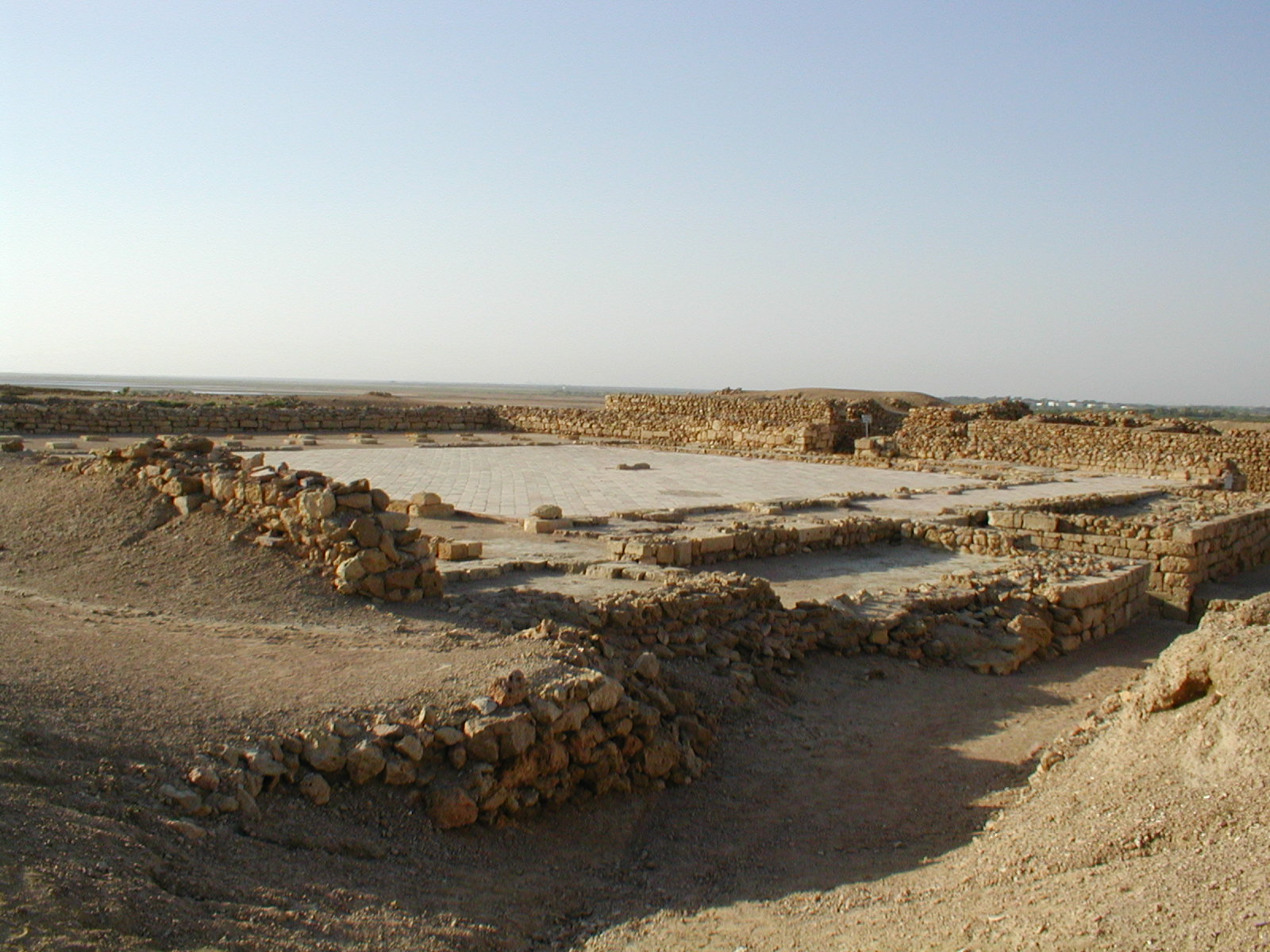

Religion
- Affiliation: Sunni Islam
- Ecclesiastical or organizational status: mosque

Location
- Location: Sindh, Pakistan
- Country: Pakistan
- Interactive map of Jamia Masjid Banbhore

Architecture
- Type: Mosque architecture
- Style: Islamic

The Jamia Masjid Banbhore is an early medieval mosque located within the archaeological site of Banbhore, in Thatta District, Sindh, Pakistan.

== History ==
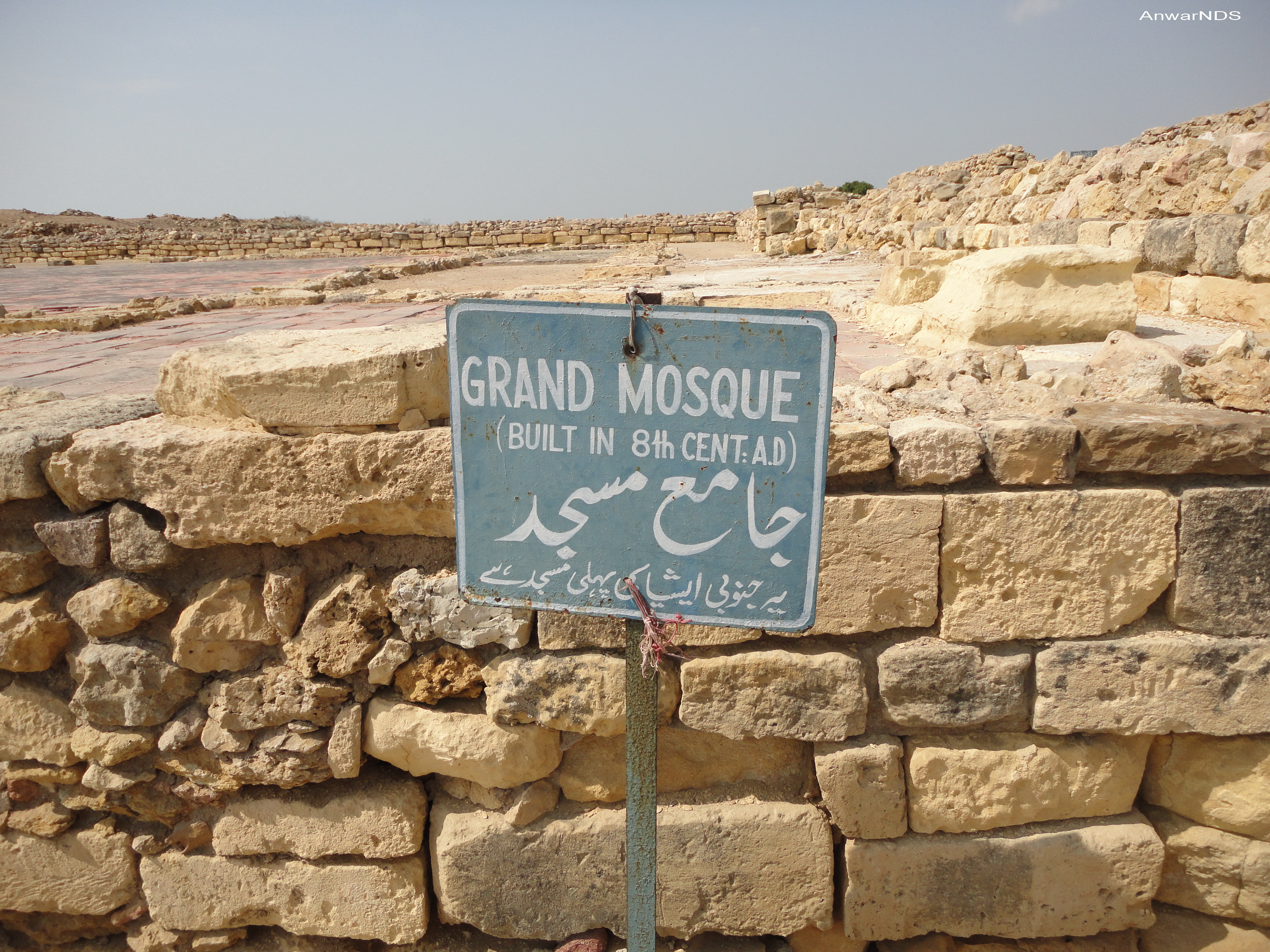
Grand Mosque (Jamma Masjid Banbhore) Panoramio

Archaeological excavations at Banbhore began in 1958, revealing remains of a once‑thriving city and among them the mosque now known as Jamia Masjid Banbhore.

An inscription found at the site dates the mosque to 727 AD (109 AH), only about 16 years after the conquest of Sindh by the Arab general Muhammad ibn Qasim in 711 AD. Because of this early date and well‑preserved ground plan, the mosque is considered among the oldest known mosques in the Indo‑Pakistan subcontinent.

The mosque is part of a larger urban and port settlement as Banbhore was a medieval port city. The mosque thus represents also social and urban history of early Islamic Sindh. It has also been proposed for heritage recognition under UNESCO as “Port of Banbhore.”

The mosque is built on a roughly square plan. Some sources give dimensions around 37 meters on each side, while others mention a 34 × 35 meter plan. The outer walls are constructed of limestone blocks and are over a meter thick. There are two main entrances.

== See also ==
- List of mosques in Pakistan
