= Al Kauthar fi Tafsir Al Quran =

- Author: Mohsin Ali Najafi
- Original title: الکوثر في تفسير القرآن
- Language: Urdu
- Subject: Qur'anic exegesis
- Genre: Islamic literature
- Publication date: November 2014
- Publication place: Pakistan
- Media type: Print (Hardcover & Paperback)

Al Kauthar fi Tafsir Al Quran is a Shi'a Muslim tafsir or an exegesis of the Quran written and compiled by the renowned Shia Scholar Mohsin Ali Najafi. It is primarily in Urdu, and is one of the best urdu exegesis available of the Quran. This task started in 1990 and was completed in November 2014. The First edition of 10 Volumes was published in November 2014.

Sheikh Mohsin Ali Najafi was born on January 1, 1938) and died on January 9, 2024. He was a Pakistani Usuli Twelver Scholar and the Head of many of the Seminaries (Hawzahs) across Pakistan. Additionally, he is also the Head of The Uswa Education System in Pakistan. He studied under Ayatullah al Uzma Abu al-Qasim al-Khoei for ten years in the Hawza/Seminary of Najaf. Later, he became Ayatullah al Uzma Abu al-Qasim al-Khoei's Special Representative to Pakistan. After the demise of Abu al-Qasim al-Khoei, He became the Special Representative of The Grand Ayatullah Ali al-Sistani to Pakistan.
