= Mina Mosque =

Mosque in Agra, Uttar Pradesh, India

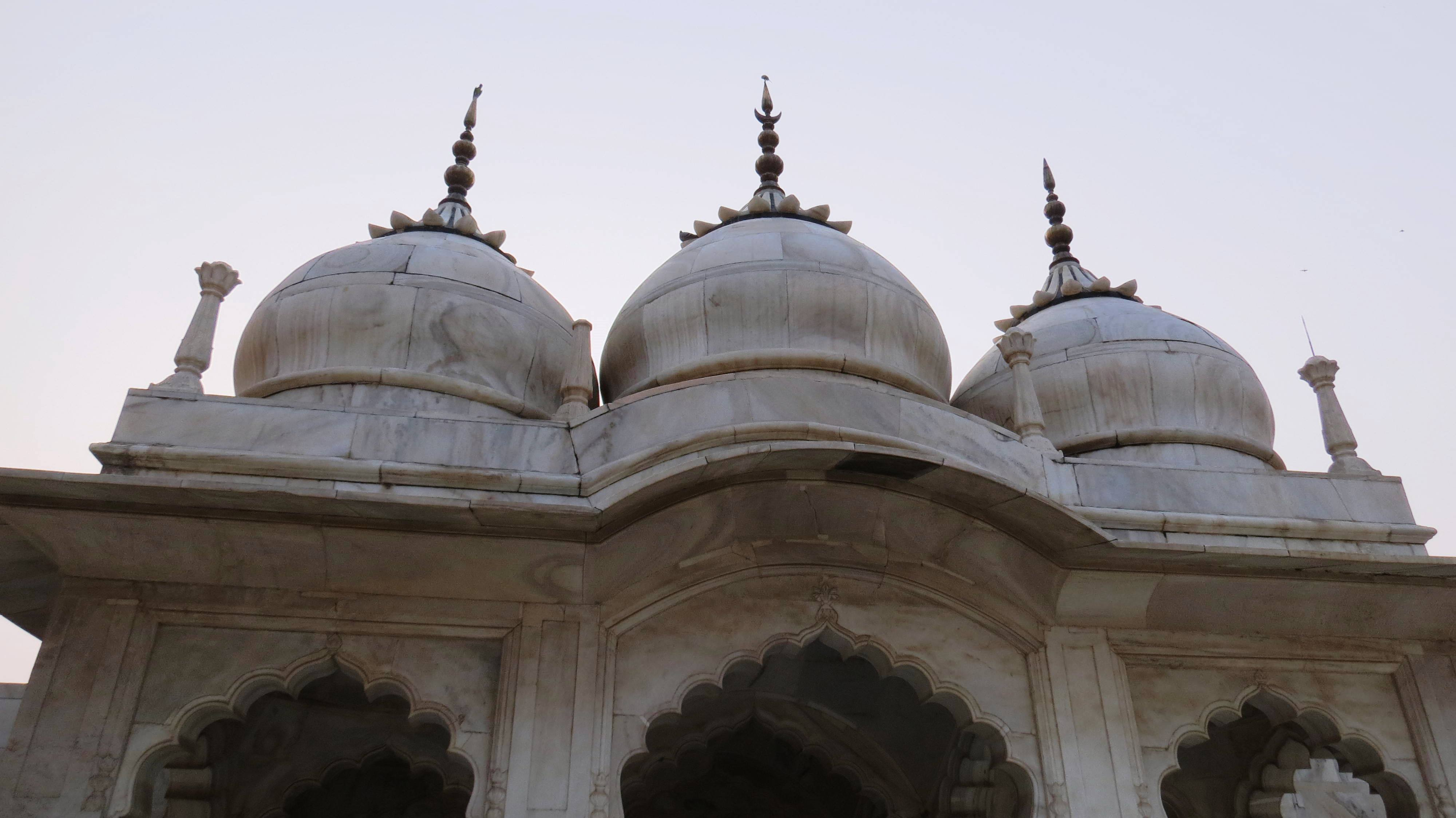
- The mosque domes in 2013

- Location of the mosque in Uttar Pradesh

Religion
- Affiliation: Sunni Islam
- Ecclesiastical or organisational status: Mosque
- Status: Active

Location
- Location: Agra Fort, Agra, Uttar Pradesh
- Country: India
- Administration: Archaeological Survey of India
- Coordinates: 27°10′43.8″N 78°01′22.6″E

Architecture
- Type: Mosque architecture
- Style: Mughal
- Founder: Shah Jahan
- Groundbreaking: 1631 CE
- Completed: 1640 CE

Specifications
- Dome: Three
- Materials: Marble

Monument of National Importance
- Official name: Agra Fort: Mina Masjid
- Reference no.: N-UP-A1-r

UNESCO World Heritage Site
- Official name: Agra Fort
- Criteria: Cultural: (iii)
- Reference: 251
- Inscription: 1984 (8th Session)
- Location of the mosque in Agra Fort

The Mina Mosque, also known as the Heavenly Mosque, is a Sunni mosque, situated near Diwan-i-Khas in the Agra Fort, a UNESCO World Heritage Site, located in Agra, in the state of Uttar Pradesh, India. The mosque was built, entirely of white marble, by Shah Jahan, the fifth Mughal Emperor, in c. 1631-1640 CE, for his personal use.

The mosque is a Monument of National Importance, administered by the Archaeological Survey of India. Currently, the mosque is not accessible to the public.

== Architecture ==
It has a small open court in front of the three-arched prayer-chamber. There is no ornamentation and it is simple. It is enclosed and secured on all sides by high walls and cannot be seen from outside and can neither be accessed without a sole passage.It is a very narrow passage arising from the corridors adjoining the Musamman Burj, at a low height where people would have to stoop to enter. This passage leads through a short flight of stairs to the mosque area. It appears that, Shah Jahan used this mosque during his imprisonment in the adjoining apartment of Musamman Burj, also called Shah Burj, from 1658 to 1666 CE.

== See also ==
- Sunni Islam in India
- List of mosques in India
- List of Monuments of National Importance in Agra district
