= Bhodesar Mosque =

Mosque in Tharparkar, Sindh, Pakistan

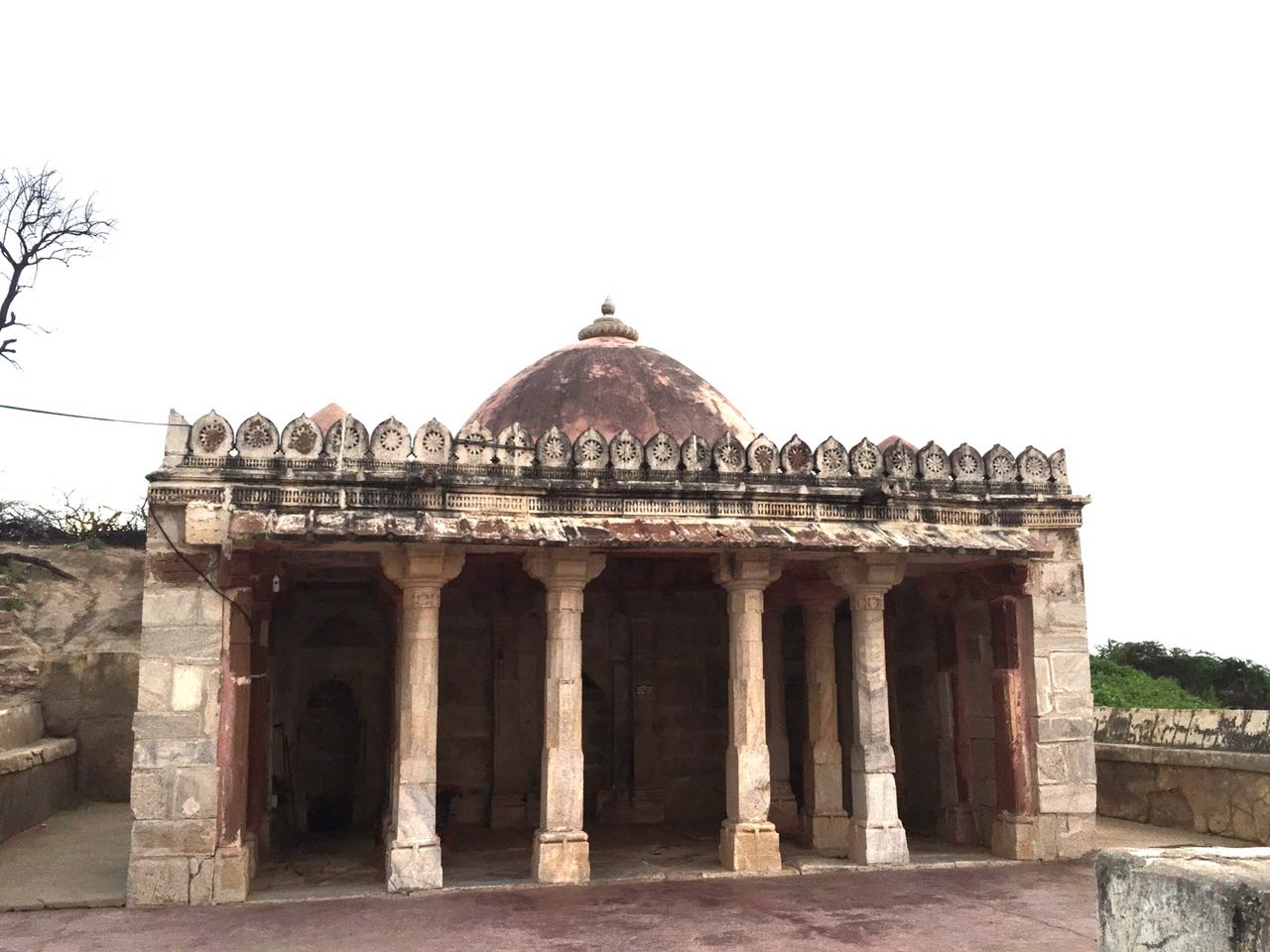
- A centuries-old stone mosque with white marble pillars

Religion
- Affiliation: Sunni Islam
- Ecclesiastical or organisational status: Mosque
- Year consecrated: 1505 CE
- Status: Active

Location
- Location: Tharparkar District, Sindh
- Country: Pakistan
- Interactive map of Bhodesar Mosque
- Coordinates: 24°23′57″N 70°43′52″E

Architecture
- Type: Mosque architecture
- Style: Jain

Specifications
- Width: 9.2 m (30 ft)
- Materials: White marble

The Bhodesar Mosque is a Sunni mosque located in Tharparkar District, Sindh, Pakistan.

The white marble mosque of Bhodesar is built in a style that was highly influenced by the architecture of nearby Jain temples. The mosque was built in 1505 CE by the Sultan Mahmud Begada of Gujarat. The mosque was built after destroying nearby Jain temples, resting upon a square-shaped edifice measuring 9.2 metres on each side. Pillars at the mosque also reflect Jain architecture, while decorative elements along the roofline were also inspired by Jain temples.
