= Tomb of Firoz Khan =

Mughal tomb in Agra, India

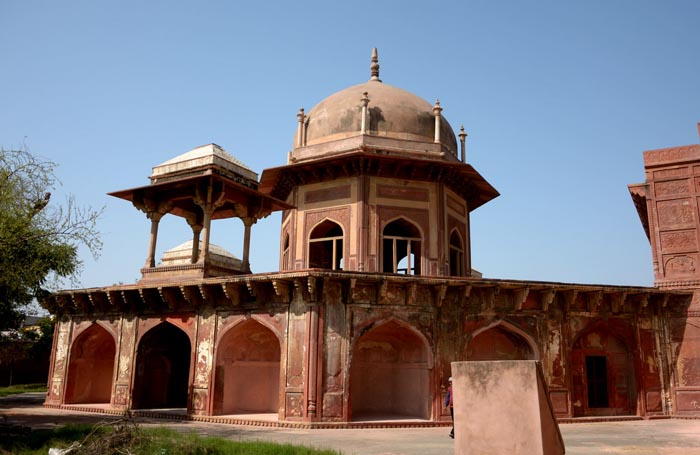
- Tomb of Firoz Khan
- Interactive map of Tomb of Firoz Khan
- Location: Agra, Uttar Pradesh, India
- Coordinates: 27.1379°N 78.0020°E
- Type: Mausoleum

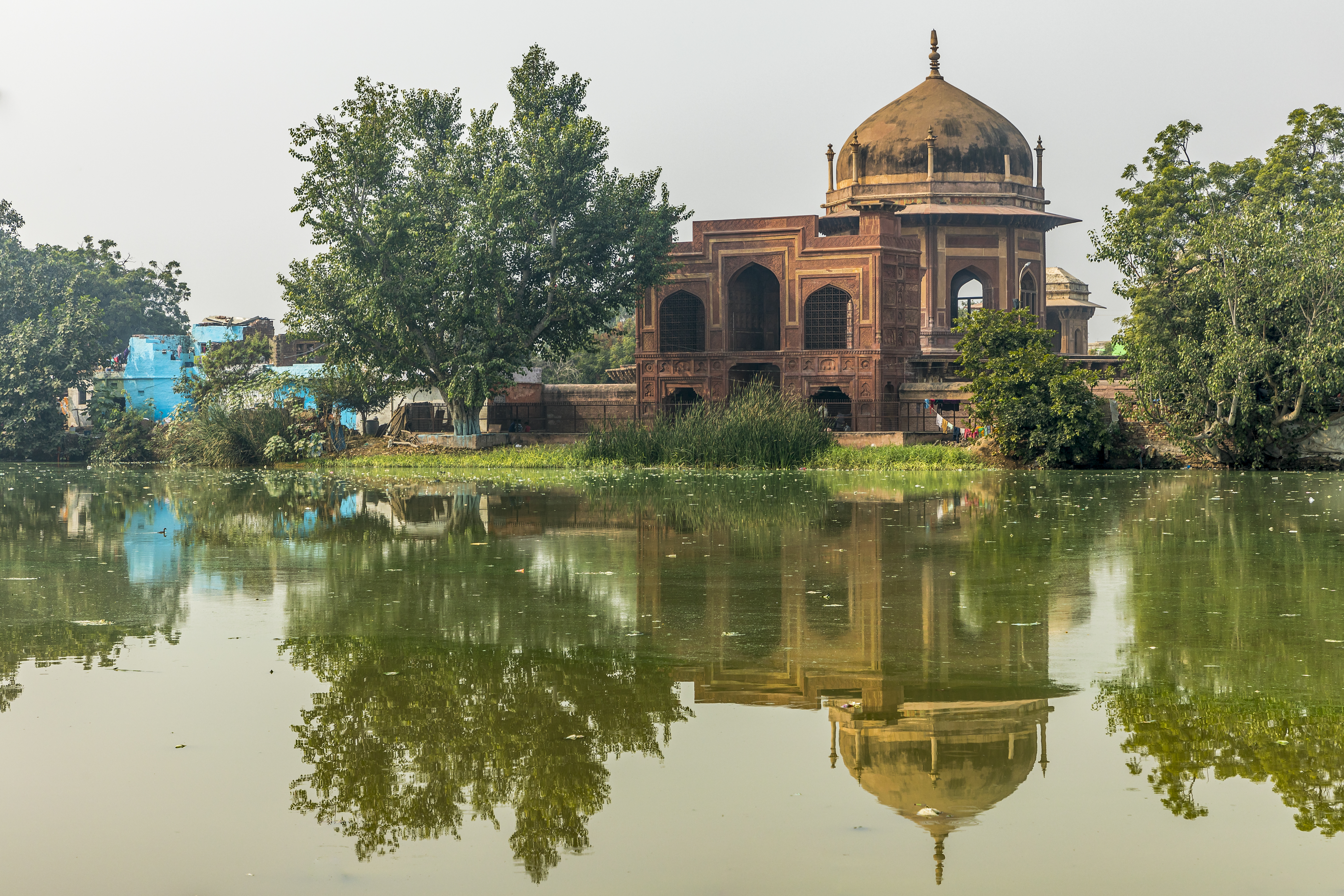
Tomb of Firoz Khan

Tomb of Firoz Khan is a Mughal tomb in Agra. It is listed as a monument of national importance.

== History ==
Firoz Khan Khwajasara was a nobleman during the reigns of Jahangir and Shah Jahan. He built the tomb for himself during his lifetime, and was buried here upon his death in 1647.

== Description ==
The mausoleum is built entirely out of red sandstone. It has an octagonal plan, with a gateway attached to the eastern side. It is a two storied structure, with the ground floor acting as a subsidiary story containing the actual grave.

The eastern gateway is an imposing double-storied structure. A broad flight of stairs lead to the entrance.

The tomb was set in a garden, with a tank towards its east.
