= Moti Masjid (Agra Fort) =

Sunni mosque in Agra, Uttar Pradesh, India

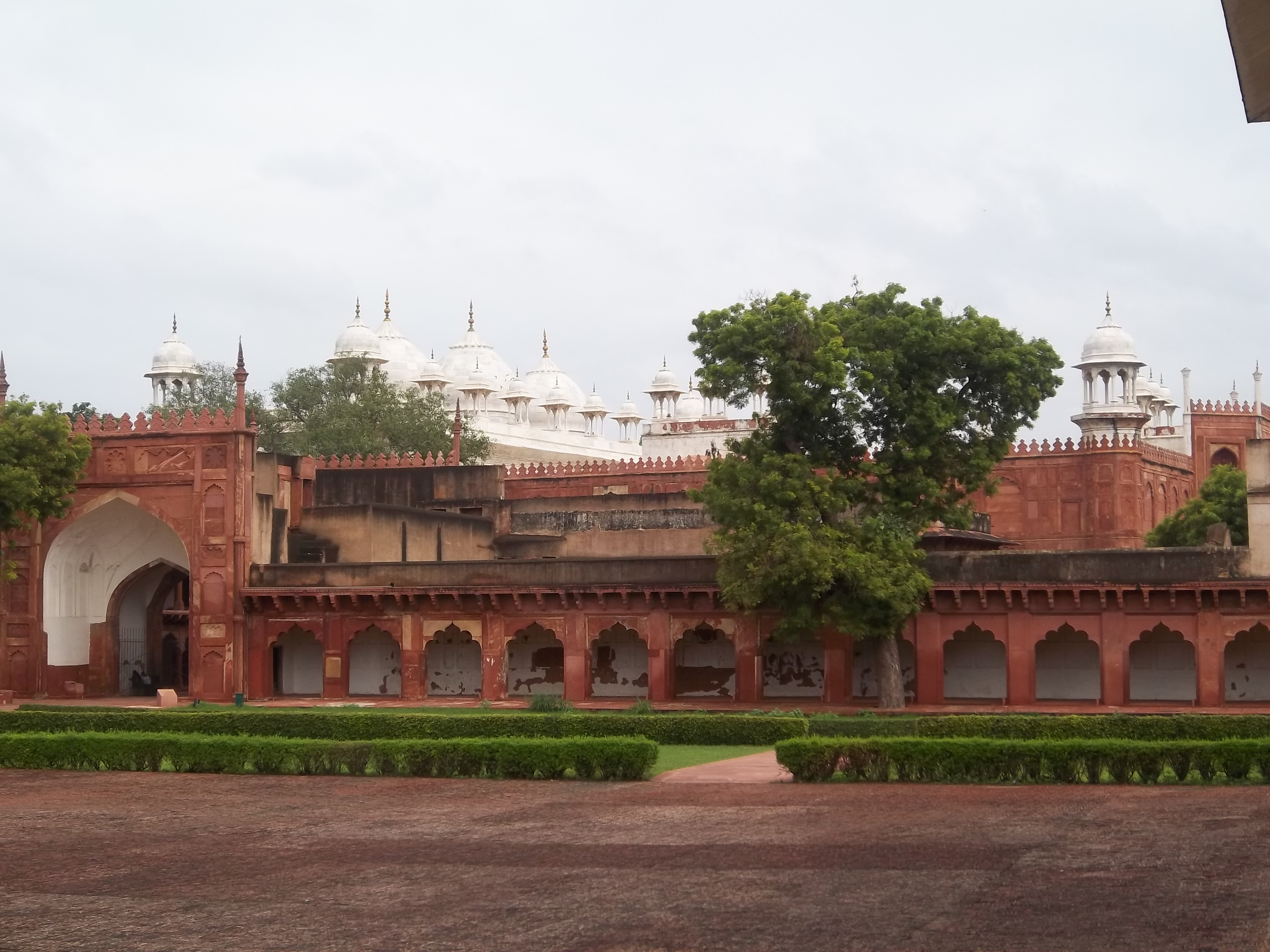
- The mosque façade in 2011

- Location of the mosque in Uttar Pradesh

Religion
- Affiliation: Sunni Islam
- Ecclesiastical or organisational status: Friday mosque
- Status: Active

Location
- Location: Agra Fort, Agra, Uttar Pradesh
- Country: India
- Administration: Archaeological Survey of India
- Coordinates: 27°10′49″N 78°01′18″E

Architecture
- Type: Mosque architecture
- Style: Indo-Islamic}Mughal
- Founder: Shah Jahan
- Completed: 1653 CE
- Construction cost: 2 lakhs 60 thousand rupees

Specifications
- Length: 71.4 m (234 ft)
- Width: 57.2 m (188 ft)
- Dome: Three (maybe more)
- Materials: Marble

Monument of National Importance
- Official name: Agra Fort: Moti Masjid or Pearl Mosque
- Reference no.: N-UP-A1-s

UNESCO World Heritage Site
- Official name: Agra Fort
- Criteria: Cultural: (iii)
- Reference: 251
- Inscription: 1984 (8th Session)
- Location of the mosque in Agra Fort

The Moti Masjid (lit. 'Pearl Mosque') is a Sunni Friday mosque, situated in the Agra Fort, a UNESCO World Heritage Site, located in Agra, in the state of Uttar Pradesh, India. Built in the 17th-century by Mughal Emperor Shah Jahan, the mosque is made entirely of white marble.

The mosque is a Monument of National Importance, administered by the Archaeological Survey of India.

== History ==
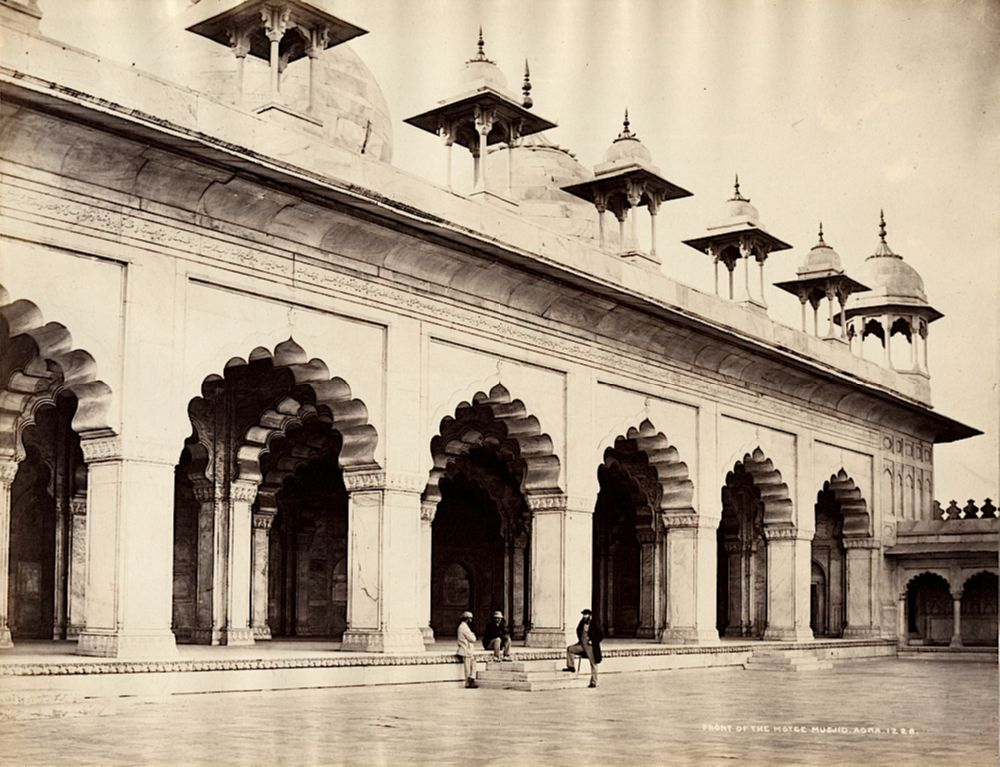
Samuel Bourne, "Front of the Motee Musjid, Agra, 1220," 1863-1869, photograph mounted on cardboard sheet, Department of Image Collections, National Gallery of Art Library, Washington, DC

The Agra Fort's modern appearance is largely owed to Shah Jahan, who dismantled several structures within the Agra Fort to add his own in marble. The Moti Masjid was one such structure. The mosque was constructed in the period 1646-1653, which was notably later than all of his other Agra Fort contributions (these were commenced in 1627, his first regnal year, and completed in 1638). The mosque's completion in 1653 was five years after the Mughal residence had shifted to Shahjahanabad. When Shah Jahan visited the mosque upon its completion, he was so impressed with the structure that he returned two years later to show two of his sons.

== Architecture ==
The mosque complex, built on a high plinth, is a walled enclosure situated to the north of the fort's courtyard. It lies on an east-west axis, and faces the Yamuna river. The outside of the walls is clad in red sandstone, while the inside bears marble. A high entryway is situated in the centre of each wall; the eastern one serves as the main entrance.

Inside the enclosure walls is a nearly-square courtyard, lined by arcades on the north, south, and eastern edges. An ablution pool lies in the centre of the courtyard.

On the western edge lies the main prayer hall itself, a multi-bayed aisle structure supported by twelve-sided piers. The façade of the hall bears seven entryways, while the roof features three domes and several chhatri. The front of the hall is shaded by a deep chhajja (eave), under which are Persian inscriptions in black marble. The inscriptions employ complex imagery to glorify Shah Jahan and the Moti Masjid. The interior of the prayer hall does not bear much decoration; Asher notes that the use of undecorated marble is typical of Shah Jahan's private religious architecture.

The Moti Masjid displays much influence from an earlier marble congregational mosque, constructed by Shah Jahan at the Ajmer Sharif Dargah.

== Gallery ==
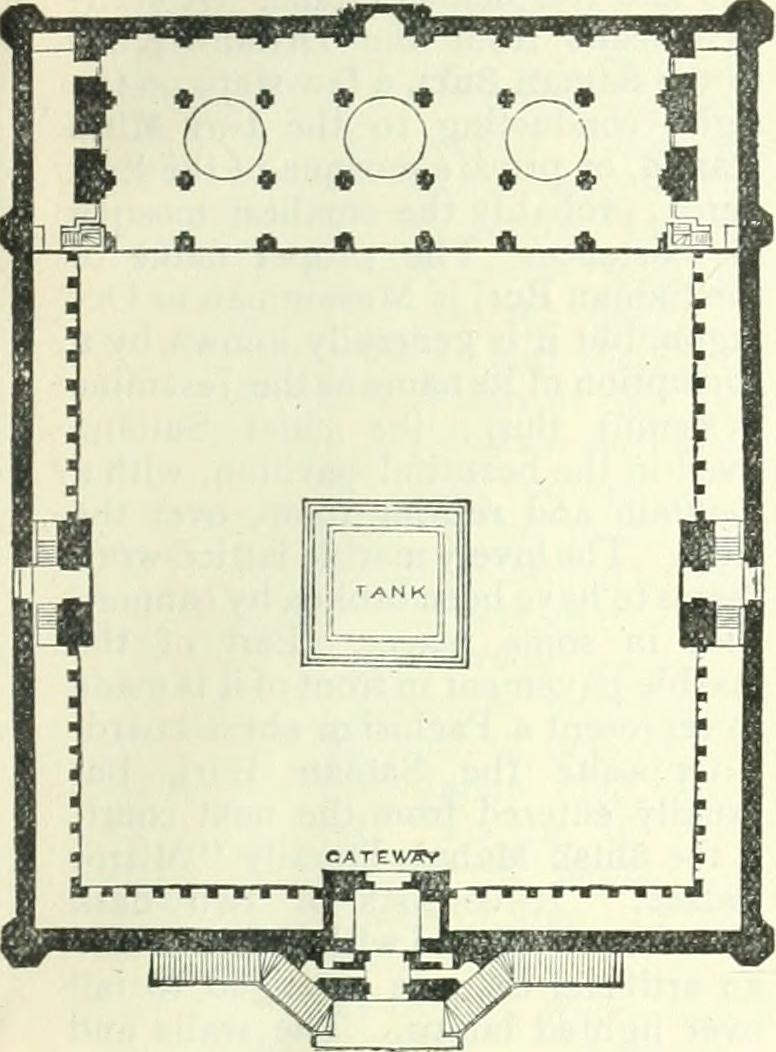
Architectural plan

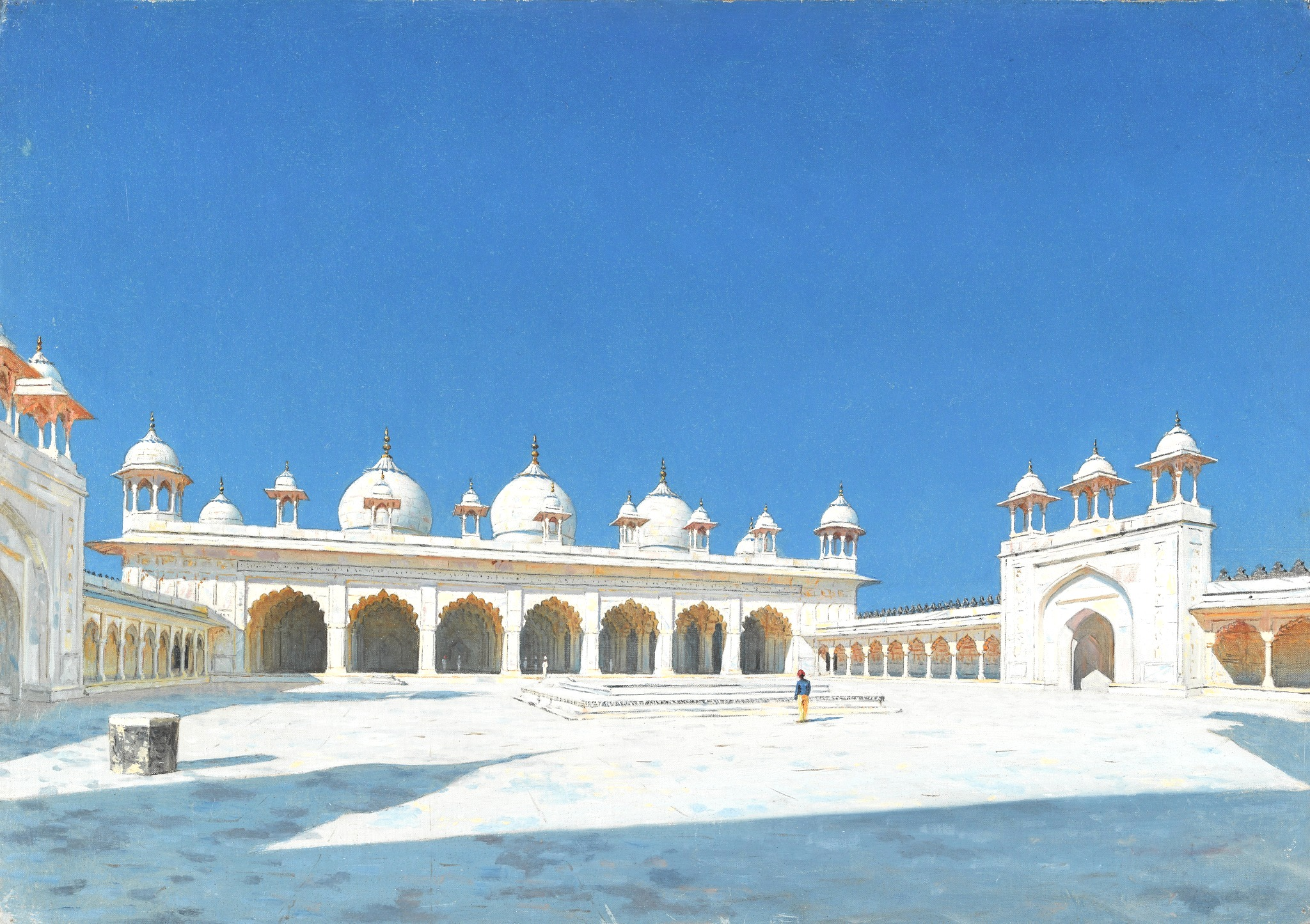
19th-century painting of the mosque by Vasily Vereshchagin

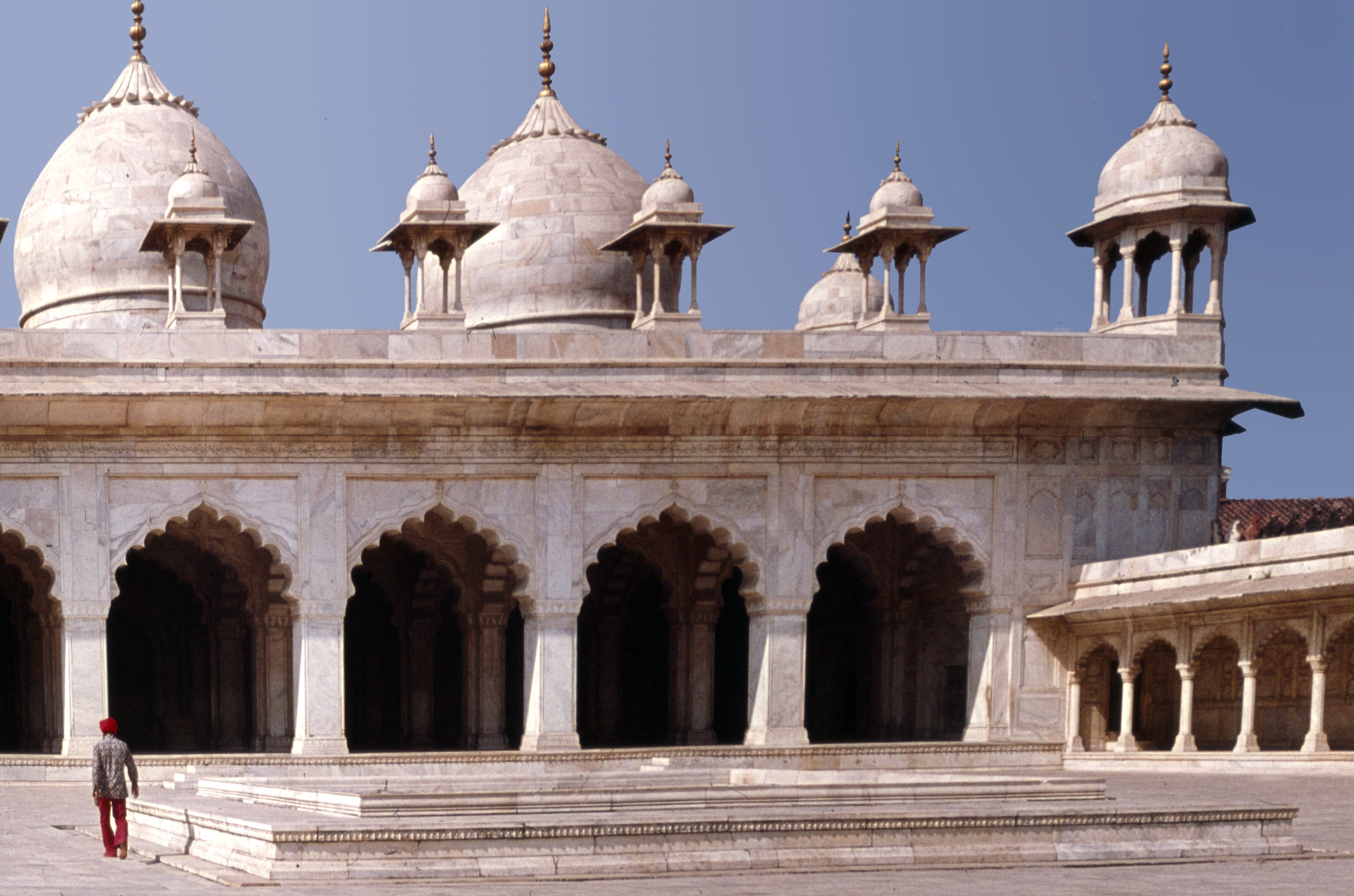
Façade of the mosque

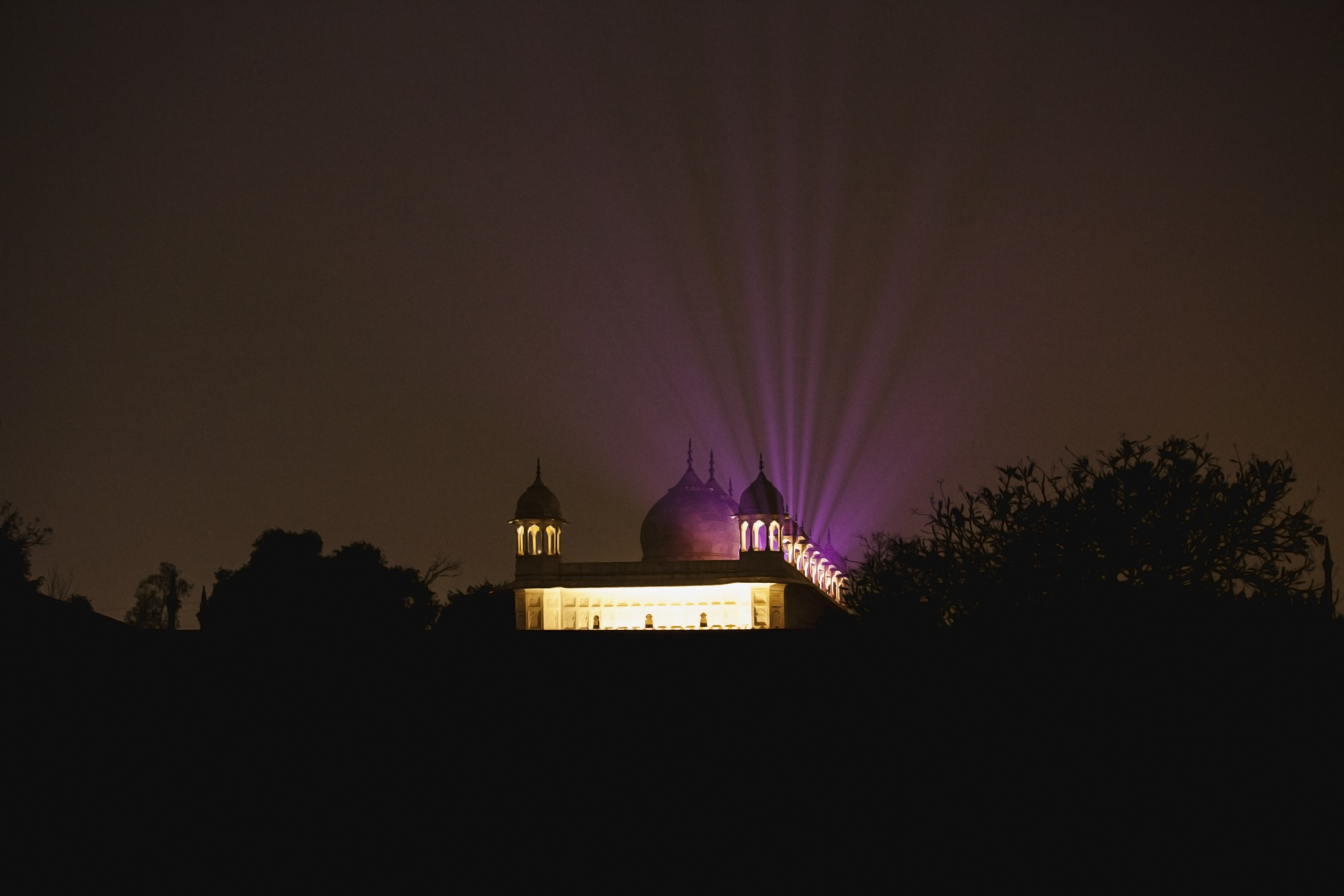
The mosque at night, in 2013

== See also ==
- Sunni Islam in India
- List of mosques in India
- List of Monuments of National Importance in Agra district
