= Al-Kawthar University =

Al-Kawthar University is a private university in Karachi, Sindh, Pakistan. It was established by the Education for You Foundation and began its first academic session in October 2024. The university was established under the Al-Kawthar University Act passed by the Provincial Assembly of Sindh and is recognised by the Higher Education Commission of Pakistan.
