= Shah Jahan Mosque =

Shah Jahan Mosque may refer to:

- Shah Jahan Mosque, Thatta, Pakistan
- Shah Jahan Mosque, Woking, England
