= Gyarah Sidhi =

Coordinates: 27°10′46.1″N 78°2′1.8″E

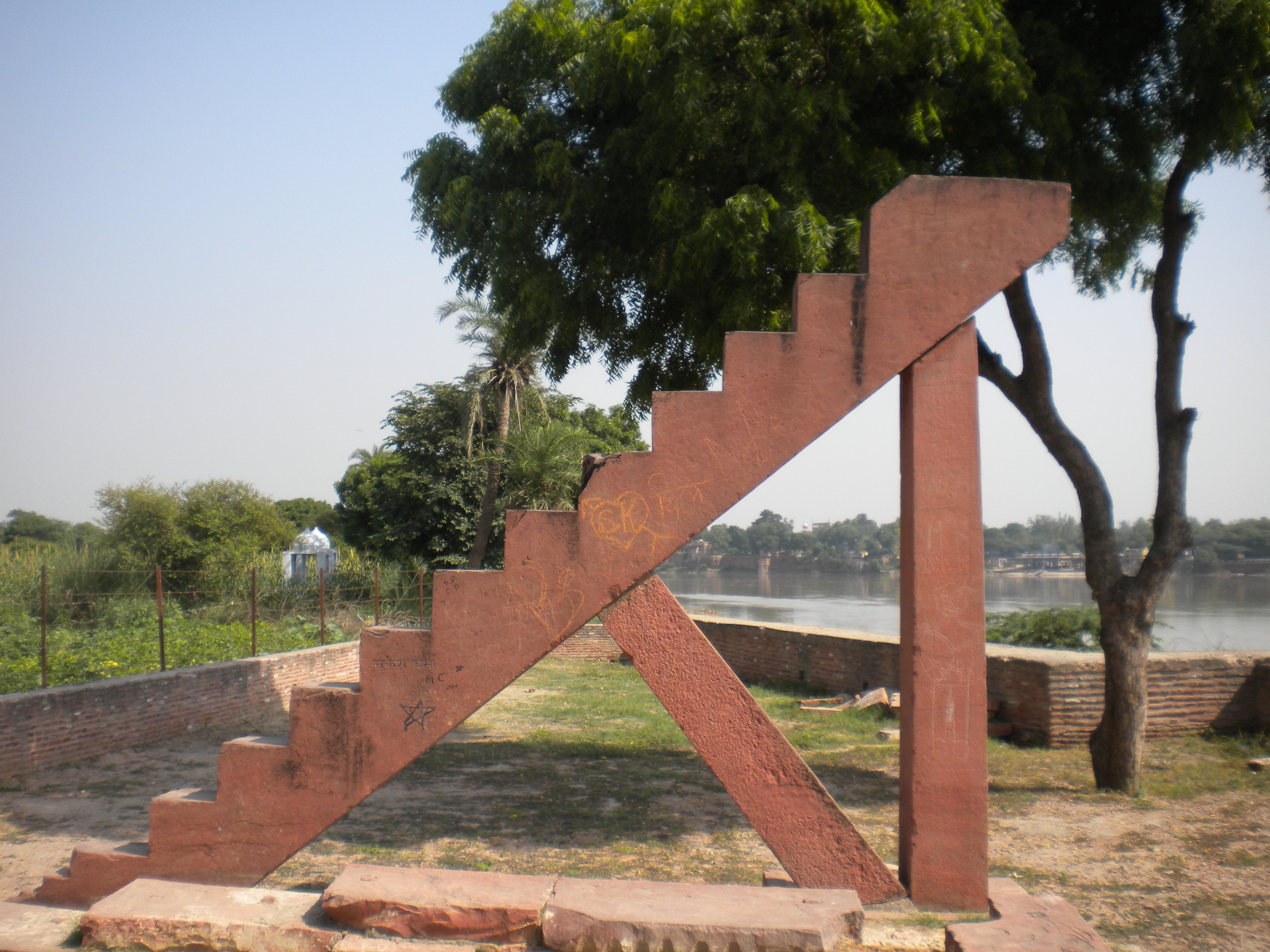
Gyarah Sidhi near Mehtab Bagh.

Gyarah Sidhi (lit. 'Eleven steps') are the remains of the astronomical observatory of the Mughal Emperor Humayun. The ruins are situated at a stone's throw from Babur’s Mehtab Bagh, in a field on the banks of the Yamuna river in Agra.

== History ==
Gyarah Sidhi or Eleven Steps refers to the steps overlooking the hemispherical cavities in the ground from which astronomical readings could be taken. Though nowhere close to their size, Humayun's observatory is an interesting, diminutive precursor to the massive Jantar Mantars at Jaipur and Delhi built nearly 200 years later.

== Humayun and astronomy ==
Humayun was absorbed in astrology and astronomy, manifesting his passion in the most eccentric way. The business at court was not conducted according to exigencies of matter on hand but deferred to the planets:

- Sunday and Tuesday for government - As the sun regulates sovereignty and Mars is the patron of soldiers.
- Saturday and Thursday were devoted to matters of religion.

He even went so far as dressing himself and his ministers according to the colours of the planets associated with particular days.

== See also ==
- Jantar Mantar (Jaipur)
- Jantar Mantar, Delhi
- Humanyun Mosque
- List of astronomical observatories
