= Shah Jahan Mosque, Thatta =

17th-century mosque in Pakistan

Shah Jahan Mosque
- شاہ جہاں مسجد
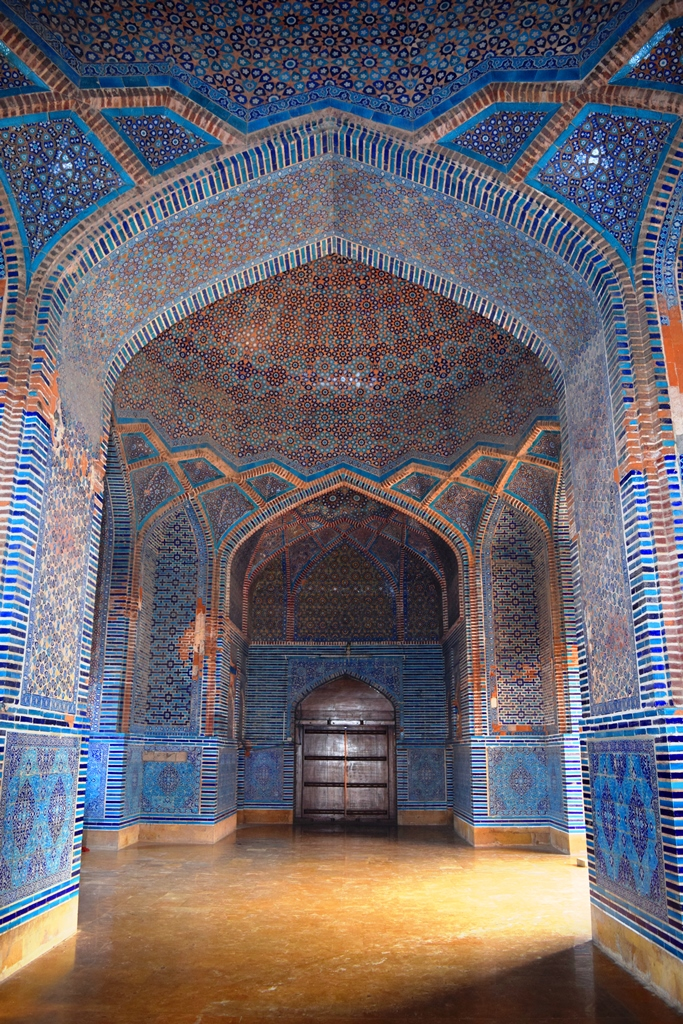
- The mosque is considered to have the most elaborate display of tile work in South Asia.

Religion
- Affiliation: Islam
- District: Thatta
- Province: Sindh
- Year consecrated: 1647

Location
- Location: Thatta; Pakistan
- Interactive map of Shah Jahan Mosque
- Coordinates: 24°44′50″N 67°55′41″E

Architecture
- Style: Safavid, Timurid, Mughal
- Completed: 1659; 367 years ago

Specifications
- Dome: 93
- Materials: Red bricks and tiles

The Shah Jahan Mosque (Urdu: شاہ جہاں مسجد, Sindhi: مسجد شاهجهاني), also known as the Friday Mosque of Thatta (Urdu: جامع مسجد ٹھٹہ, Sindhi: شاھجھاني مسجد ٺٽو), serves as the main congregational mosque for the city of Thatta, in the Pakistani province of Sindh. Constructed in the 17th century, it is considered to have the most elaborate display of tile-work in South Asia, and is also notable for its geometric brick work—a decorative element that is unusual for Mughal period mosques.

It was built during the reign of Mughal emperor Shah Jahan, who ordered its construction as a token of gratitude for the hospitality he received from the people of Sindh when he was a refugee in the city after rebelling against his father, Jahangir. It is heavily influenced by Central Asian architecture—a reflection of Central Asian campaign of Shah Jahan shortly before its construction started.

== Location ==
The mosque is located in eastern Thatta, the capital of Sindh in the 16th and 17th centuries before regional capital was shifted to nearby Hyderabad. It is located near the Makli Necropolis, a UNESCO World Heritage Site. The site is approximately 100 kilometres (62 mi) from Karachi.

== Background ==
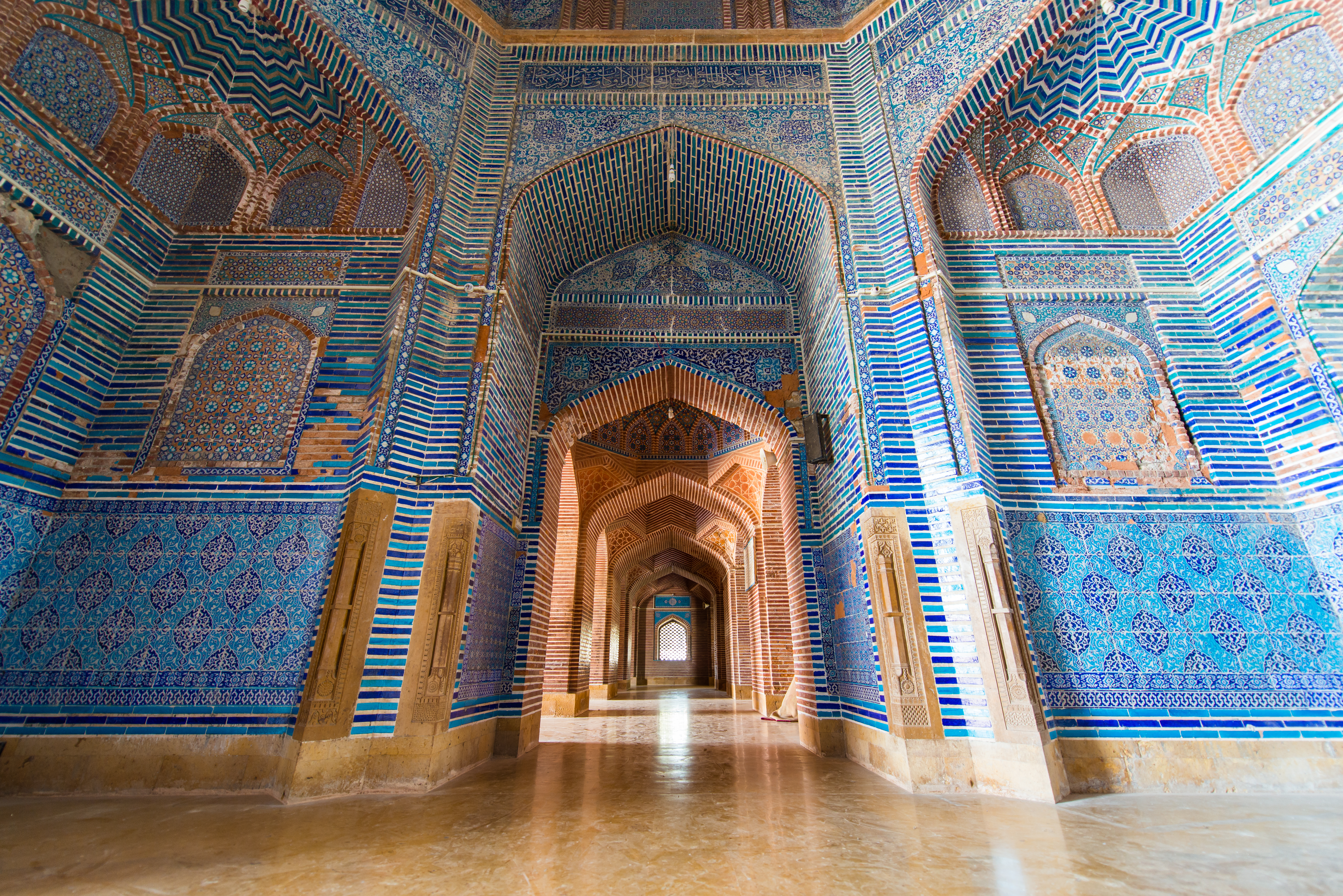
The tile-work of the mosque is influenced by the Timurid architecture.

Shah Jahan had sought refuge in Thatta from his father Jahangir after he had rebelled against him. He was impressed by the hospitality he received from the Sindhi people, and ordered construction of the mosque as a token of gratitude.

Construction of the mosque may have also been partially motivated by a desire to help alleviate the effects of a devastating storm that impacted the region in 1637, nearly destroying Thatta.

During this time Shah Jahan was occupied with his central Asian campaign to recover his ancestral city of Samarkand, which may have resulted in more pronounced Timurid architectural influences in the design of Friday Mosque of Thatta. Although Shah Jahan was not in the region during its construction, and so was unlikely directly involved in its construction, its extravagant tile-work and intricate brick work indicate that it was an imperial project.

== History ==
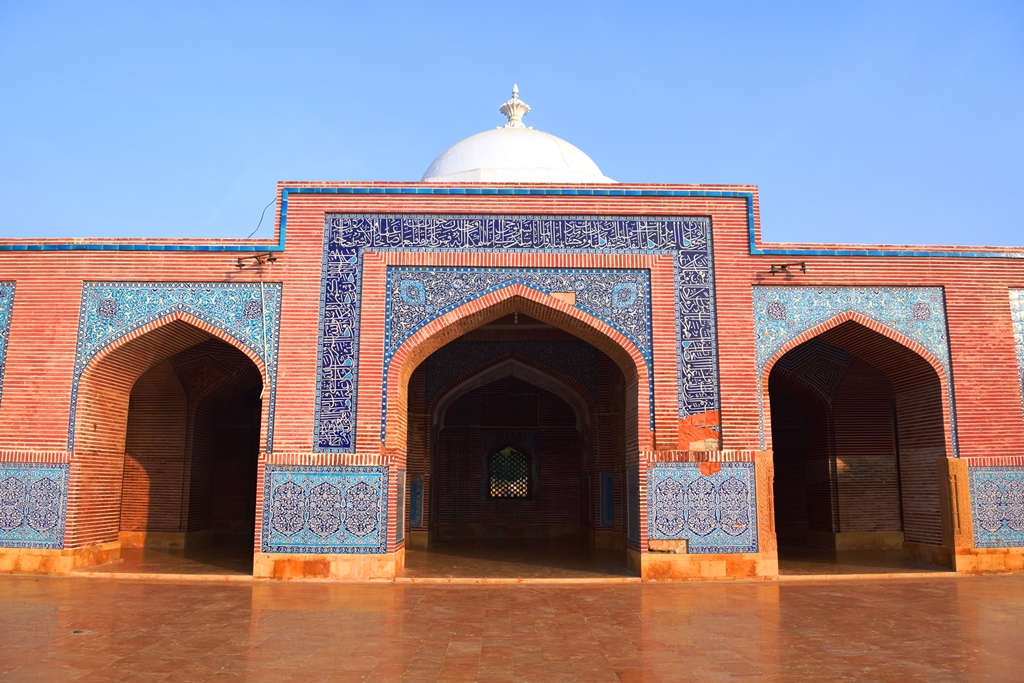
The entryway to the main prayer hall from the central courtyard.

Persian-language inscription at the mosque indicate that it was built between 1644 and 1647. An eastern addition was completed in 1659, during the reign of Aurangzeb.

The mosque's mihrab had initially been incorrectly aligned with Mecca. The Sufi mystic, Makhdum Lutufullah, who is buried in the nearby city of Hala is said to have been approached by the mosque's planners in order to correct its alignment, and according to popular tradition he corrected the error by the power of his prayer. Historical records show that the mosque's mihrab had actually been rebuilt a century after the mosque's construction.

== Architecture ==
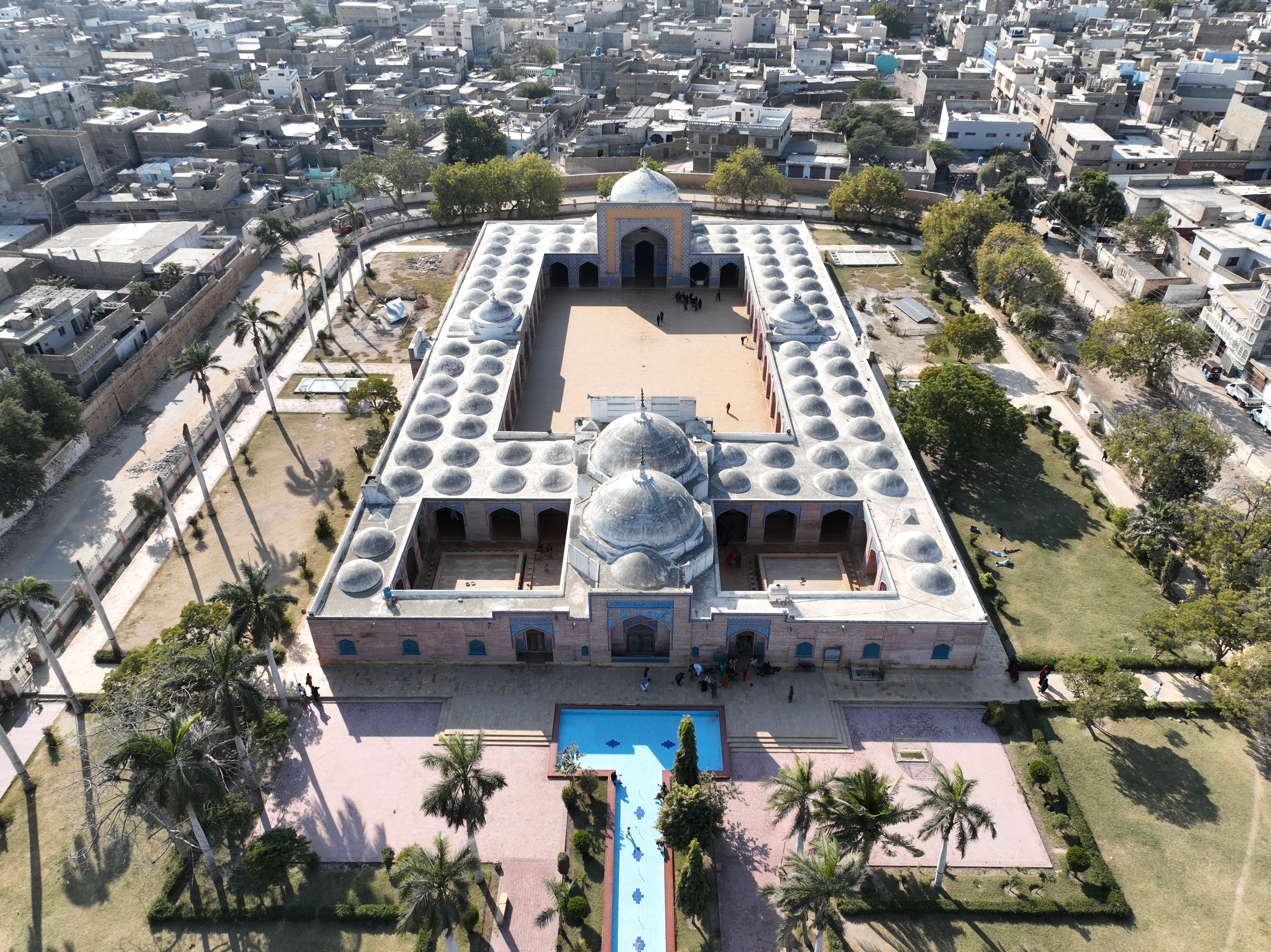
An aerial view of Shah Jahan Mosque, displaying caravanserai-style architecture.

The Shah Jahan Mosque was constructed in the style of a caravanserai—having a great courtyard enclosed by domed apartments. Its architectural style is influenced by Turkic and Iranian styles. The mosque is characterized by extensive brickwork and the use of blue tiles, both of which were directly influenced by Timurid architectural styles from Central Asia—the area from which the previous rulers of Sindh, the Tarkhans, hailed before the region was annexed by the Mughals in 1592.

=== Decorative elements ===
==== Tile work ====
Interior views of tile-decorated domes of the mosque

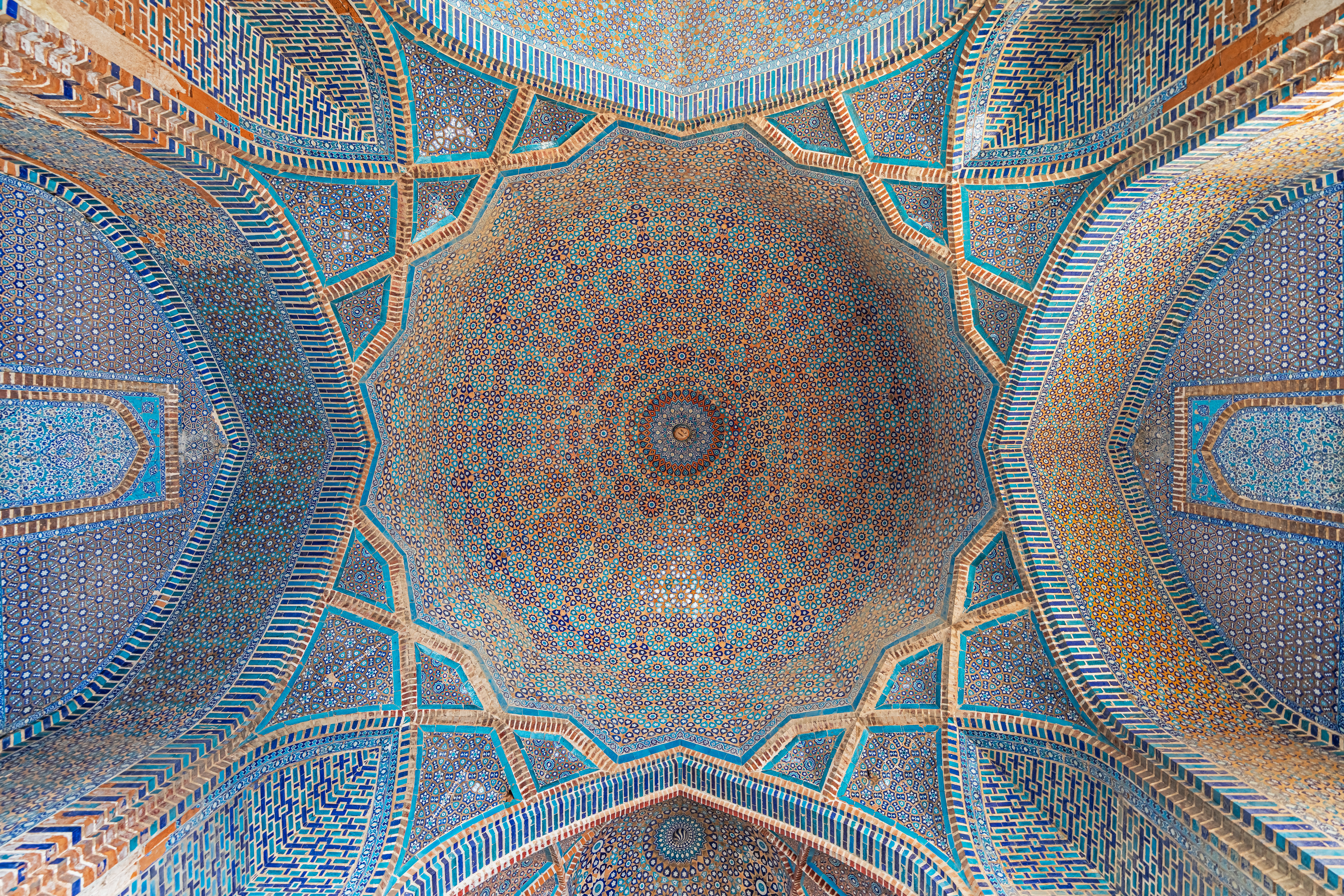
The mosque's main dome has tiles arranged in a stellate pattern to represent the night sky.

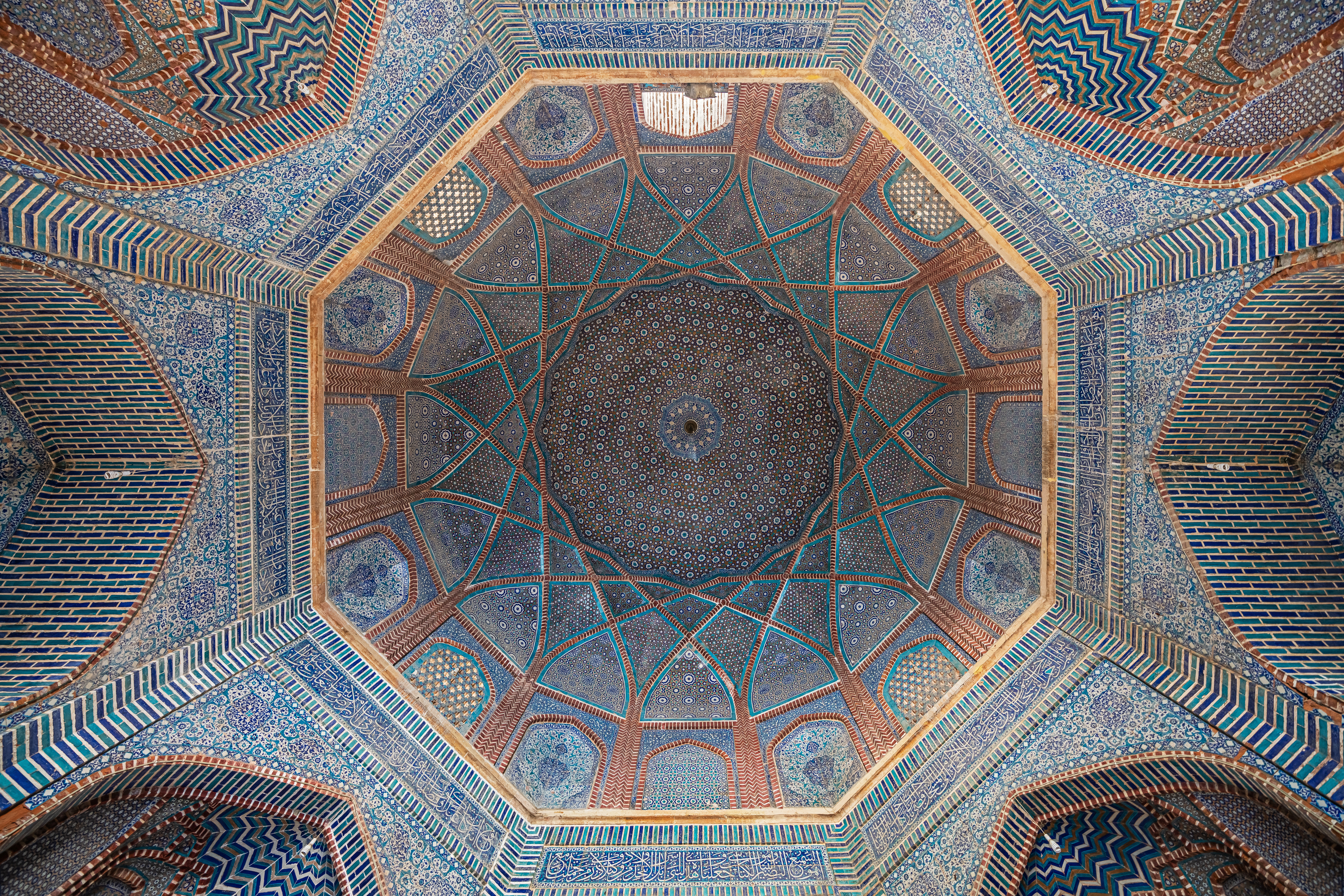
A secondary dome decorated with tile work

The profuse use of tiles is considered to be the most elaborate display of tile work in the South Asia. Unlike the Wazir Khan Mosque in Lahore, another Shah Jahan-era mosque, the mosque in Thatta does not employ the use of frescoes.

The mosque employs cobalt blue, turquoise, manganese violet, and white tiles. Its dome is embellished with blue and white tile-work arranged in stellated patterns to represent the heavens. Its walls feature calligraphic tile work, signed by Abdul Ghafur and Abdul Sheikh.

The tiles' location and arrangement suggest Safavid influence, and features several colours on a single tile, unlike tile work at Lahore which featured a single colour on each tile. The use of multicolour tiles and floral patterns reflects Persian Kashani influences.

==== Brick work ====
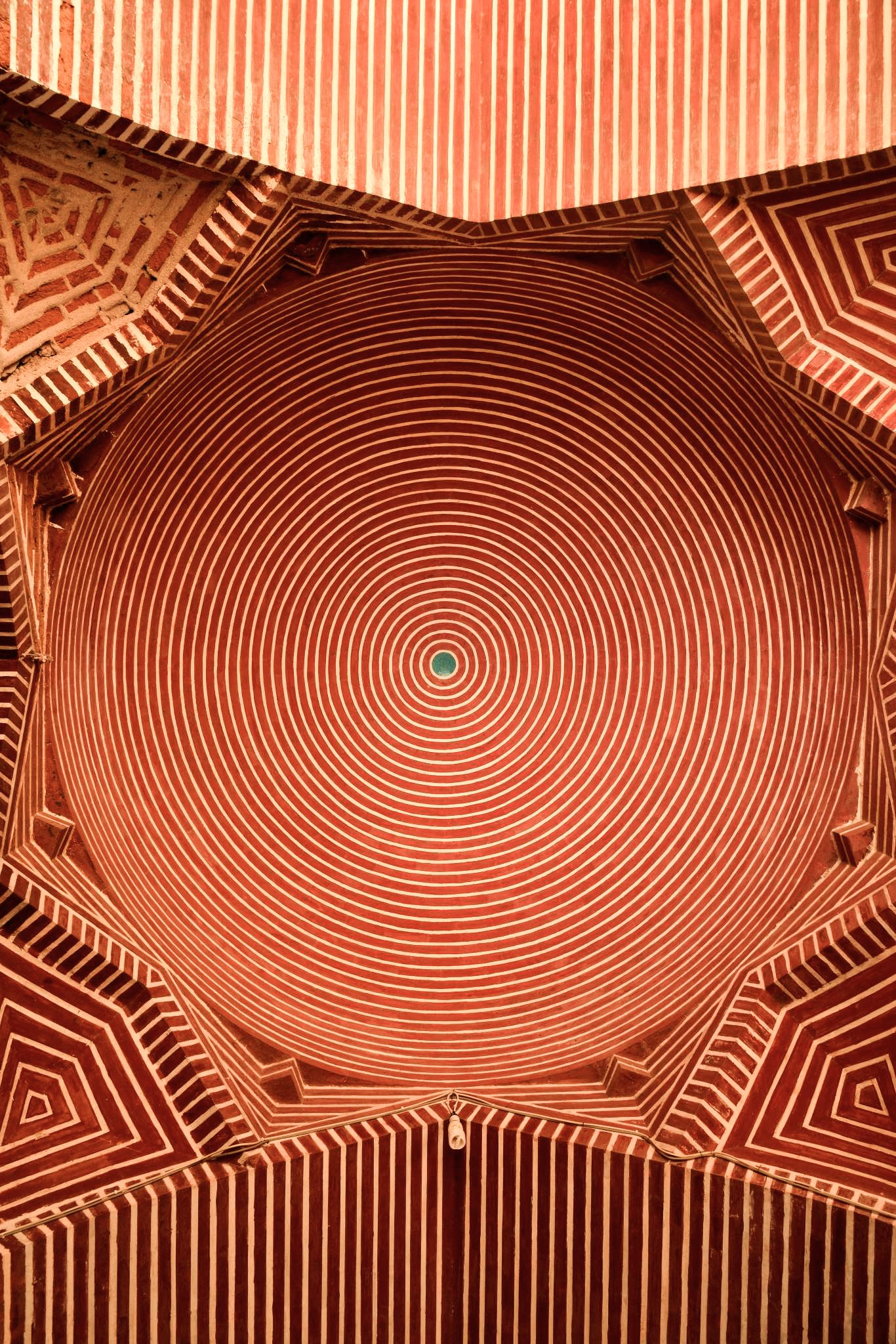
The mosque showcases brickwork in geometric patterns.

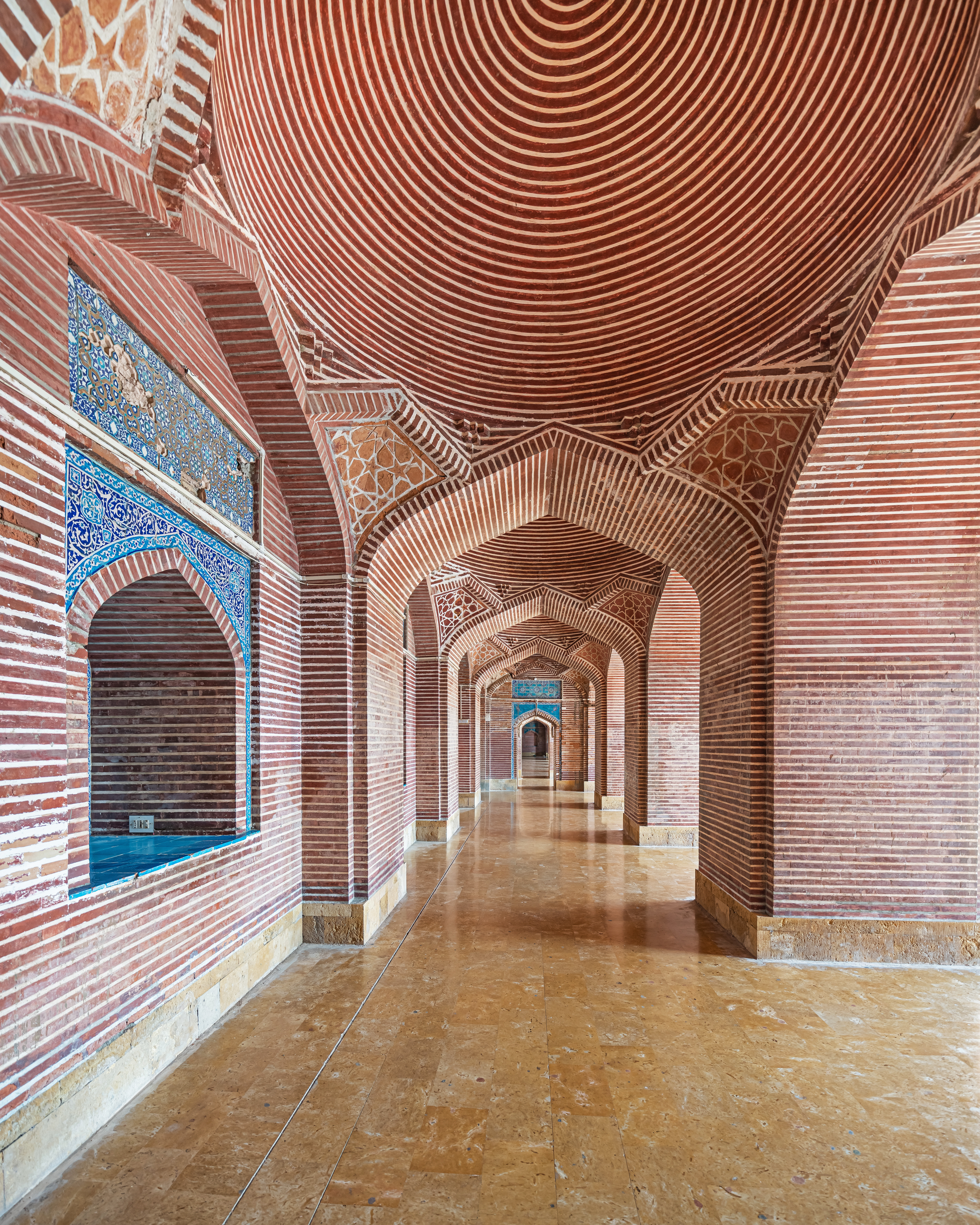
Brickwork along corridors

The mosque features extensive brickwork laid in geometric patterns, which is a decorative element unusual for Mughal-era mosques, and is an element of Timurid architecture adopted for use in the mosque. The mosque's brickwork was also influenced by Sindhi vernacular styles, which in turn was influenced by Persian architecture. Brick work is most notable in the arcades surrounding the central courtyard, while concentric rings of brick are used to embellish the underside of peripheral domes.

=== Layout ===
The layout of the mosque may have been influenced by the conservative Timurid-style Humayun Mosque in Kachhpura, near the city of Agra, in modern-day India. The main entryway into the mosque complex is through a Persian-style charbagh, or quadrangle garden.

It has a four-iwan layout. The main prayer hall is set to the west of its central courtyard, which features iwans, or portals, in each of its four cardinal directions. The courtyard is rectangular in shape, and measures 169 feet (52 m) by 97 feet (30 m). It is surrounded by aisled galleries, which are lined with 33 arches.

The mosque's mihrab features pierced screens—an element that is commonly employed on Mughal funerary monuments, but unusual in Mughal mosques. The mosque features excellent acoustics; a person speaking on one end of the dome can be heard from the other end when the speech exceeds 100 decibels. Prayers in the main prayer hall can be heard throughout the entire building.

The mosque is unusual for its lack of minarets. It has a total of 93 domes, the most of any structure in Pakistan.

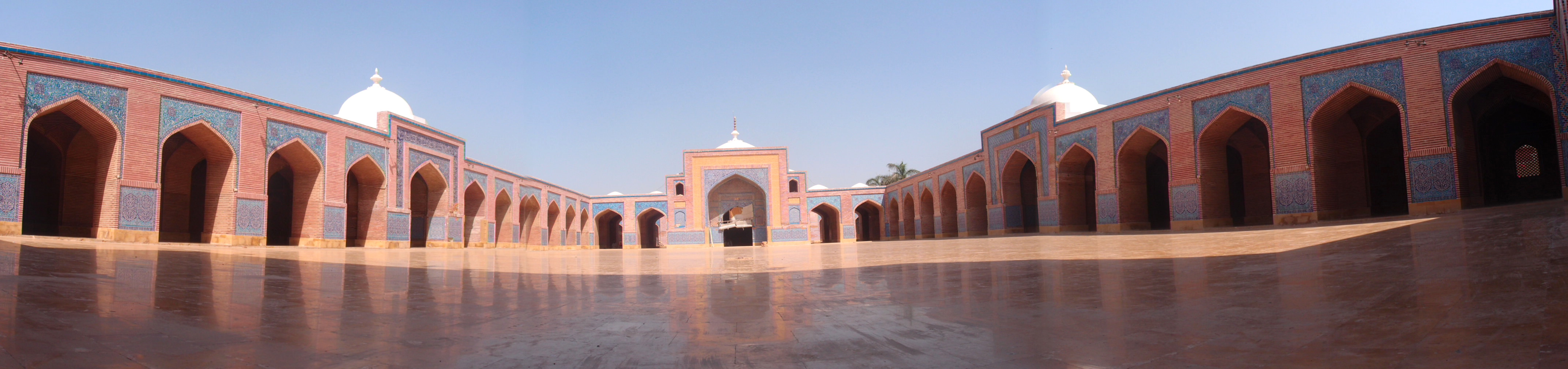
A panoramic view of the mosque's courtyard, showing three of the mosque's four iwans

== Conservation ==
Restoration works were carried out by Emperor Aurangzeb in 1692, as well as by Murad Ali Khan Talpur in 1812. The mosque was inscribed on the tentative UNESCO World Heritage list in 1993, but has not been conserved to the same high standards as the Wazir Khan Mosque or Badshahi Mosque in central Pakistan.

== Gallery ==
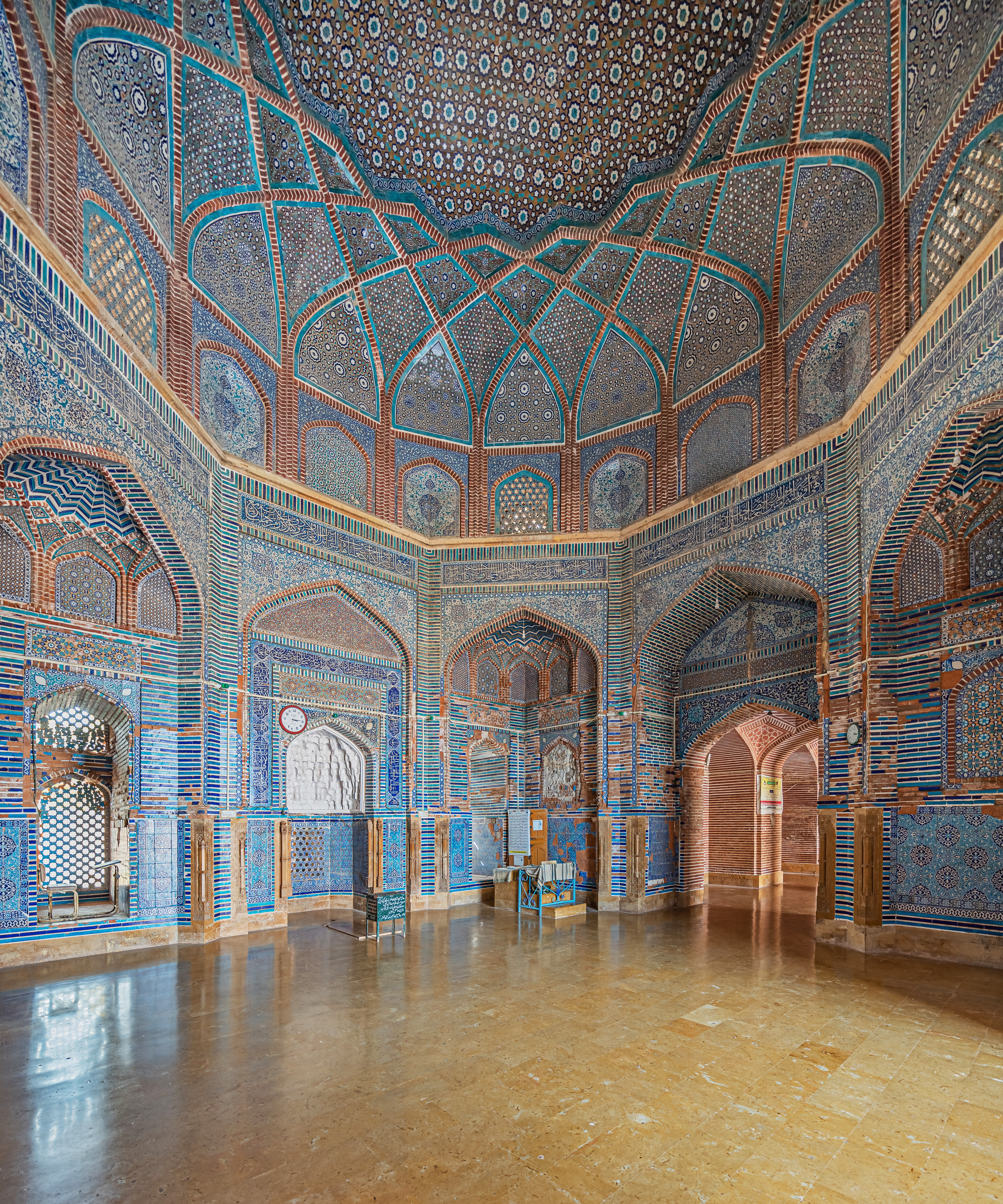
The mosque's mihrab

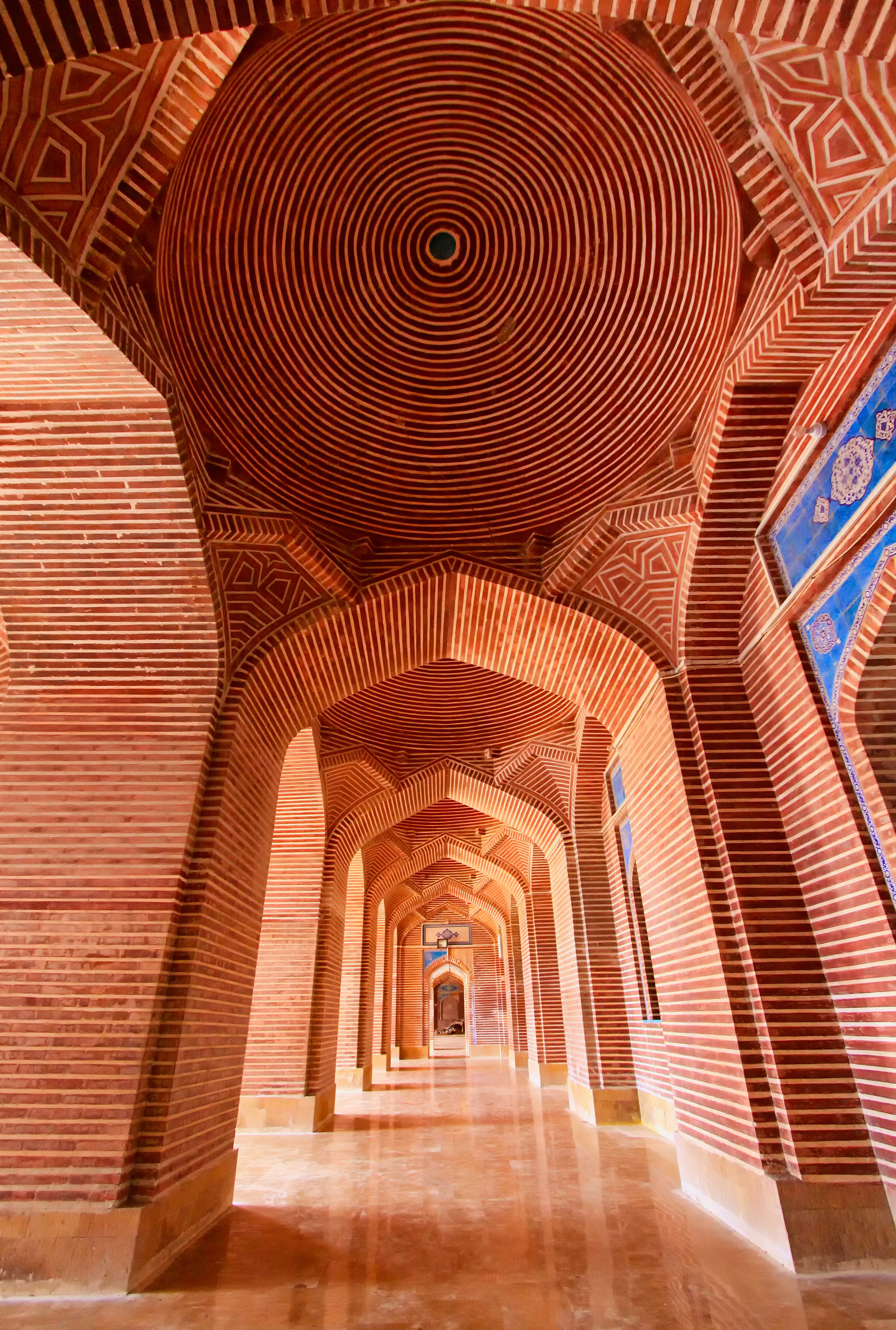
Arcades around the central courtyard feature bricks laid in geometric patterns

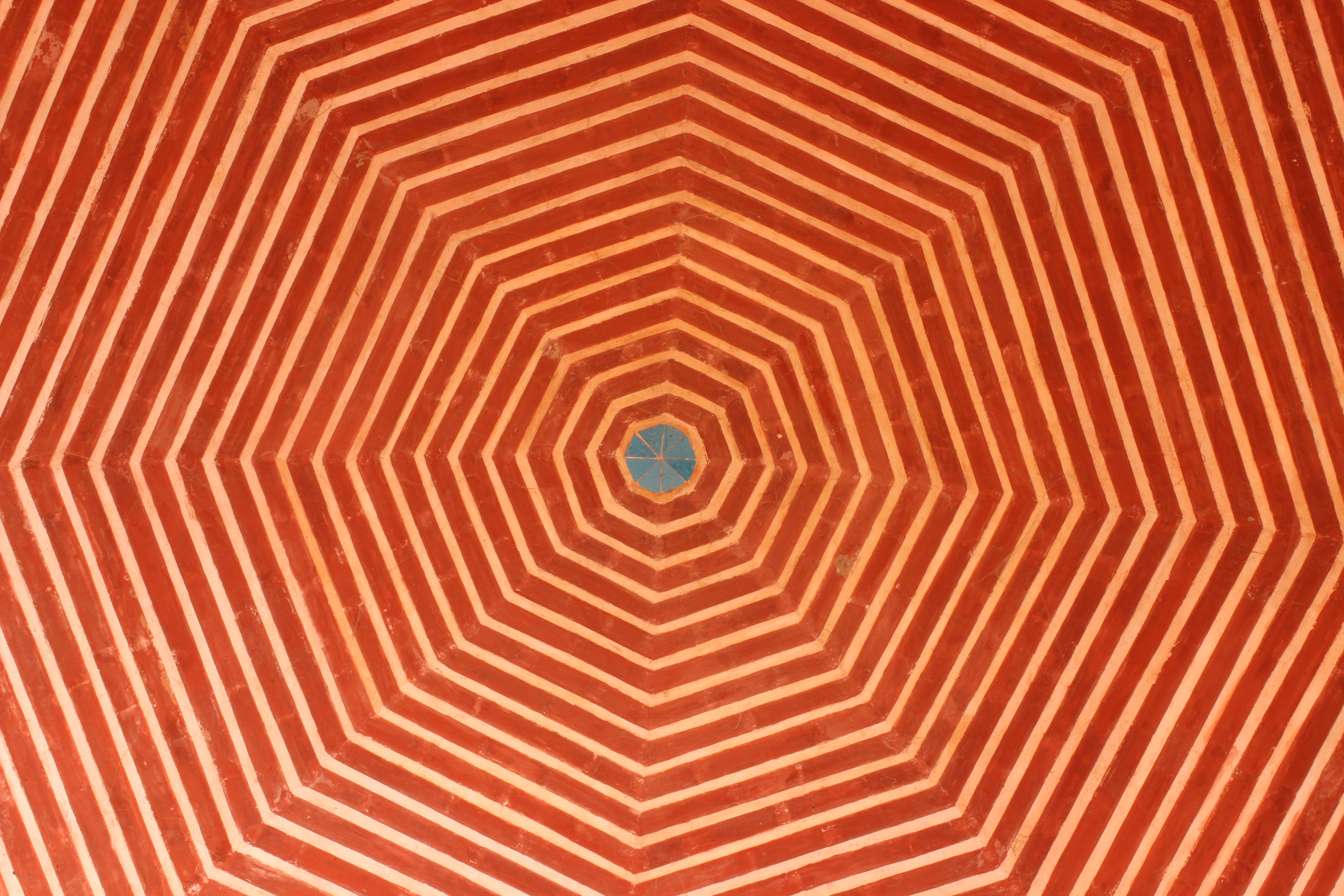
A close up view of mosque's geometric brickwork

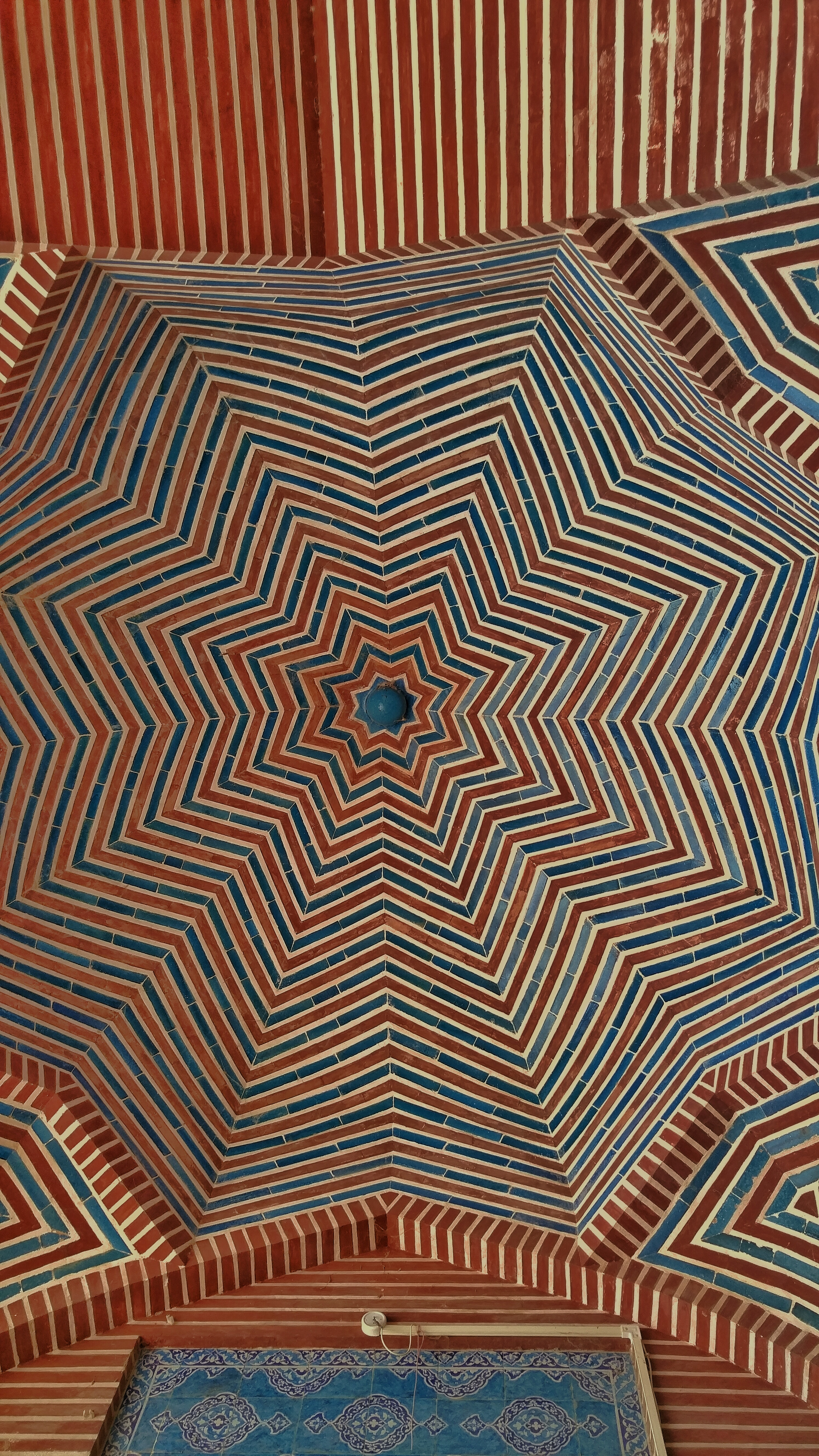
Some peripheral domes feature colored tiles as well as brick.

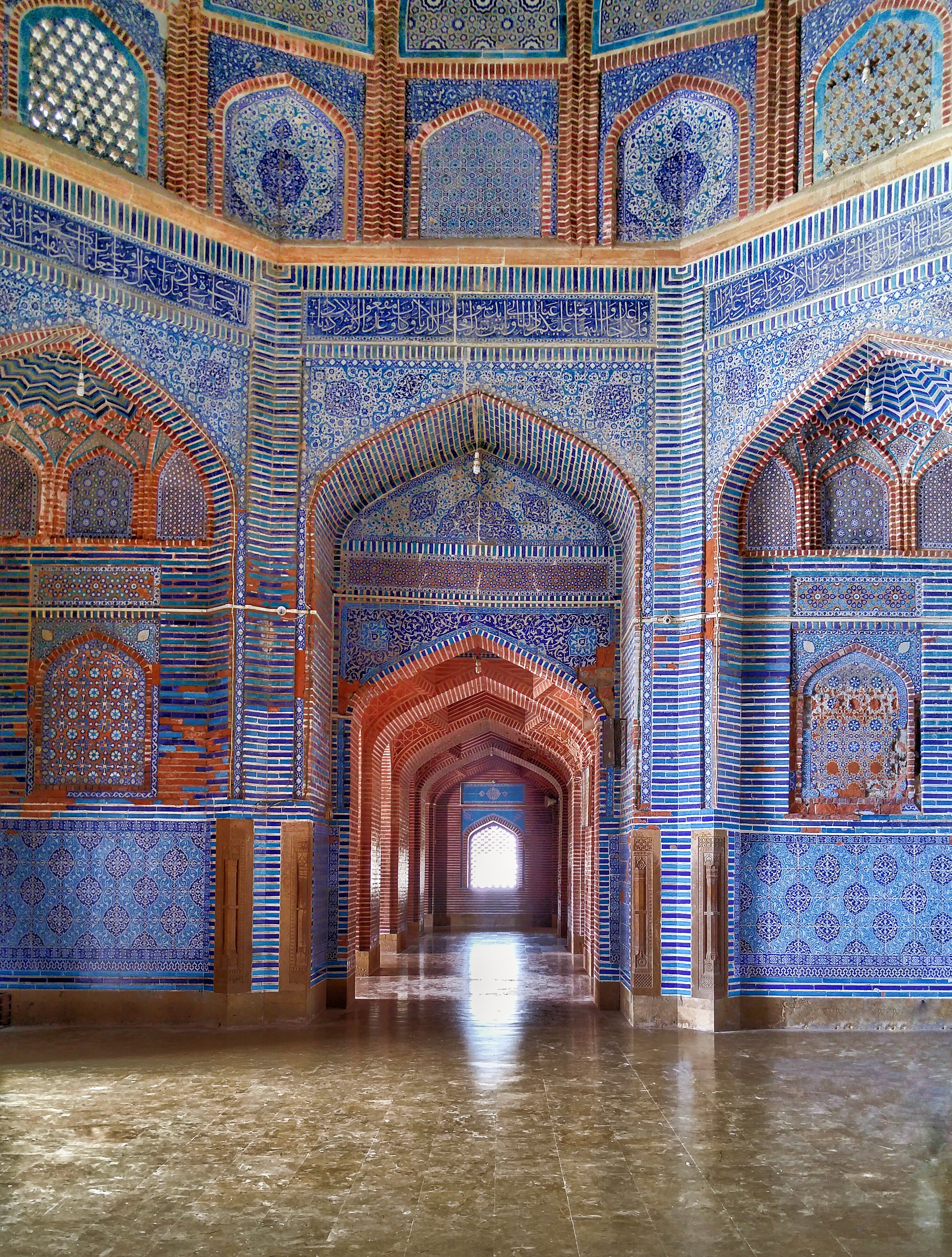
Arches off of the central prayer chamber are decorated with blue Sindhi tiles

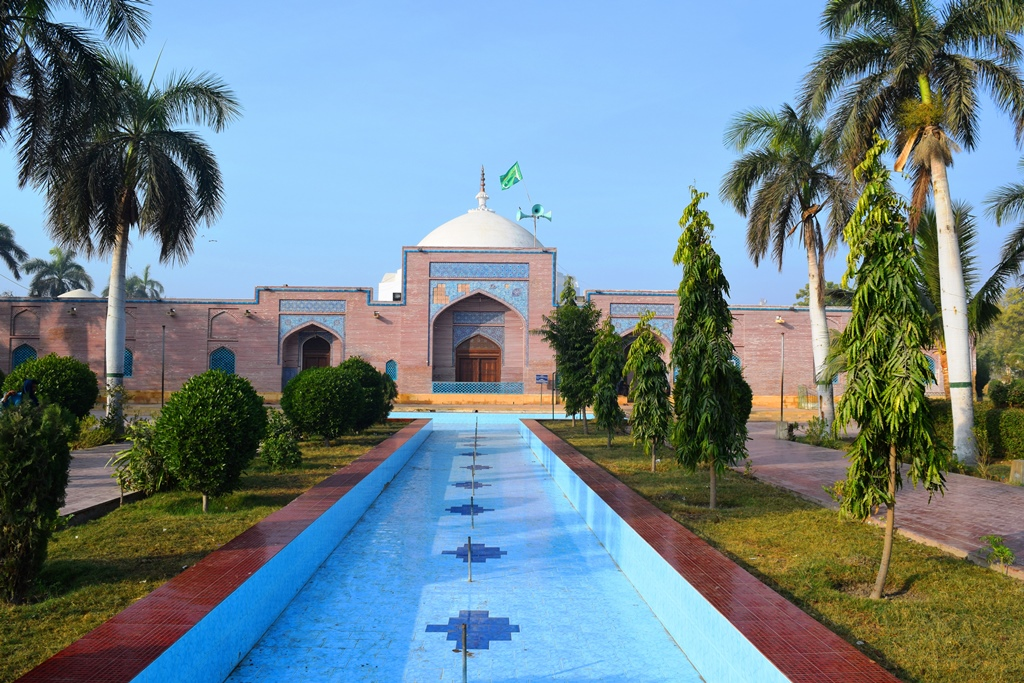
View from the gardens

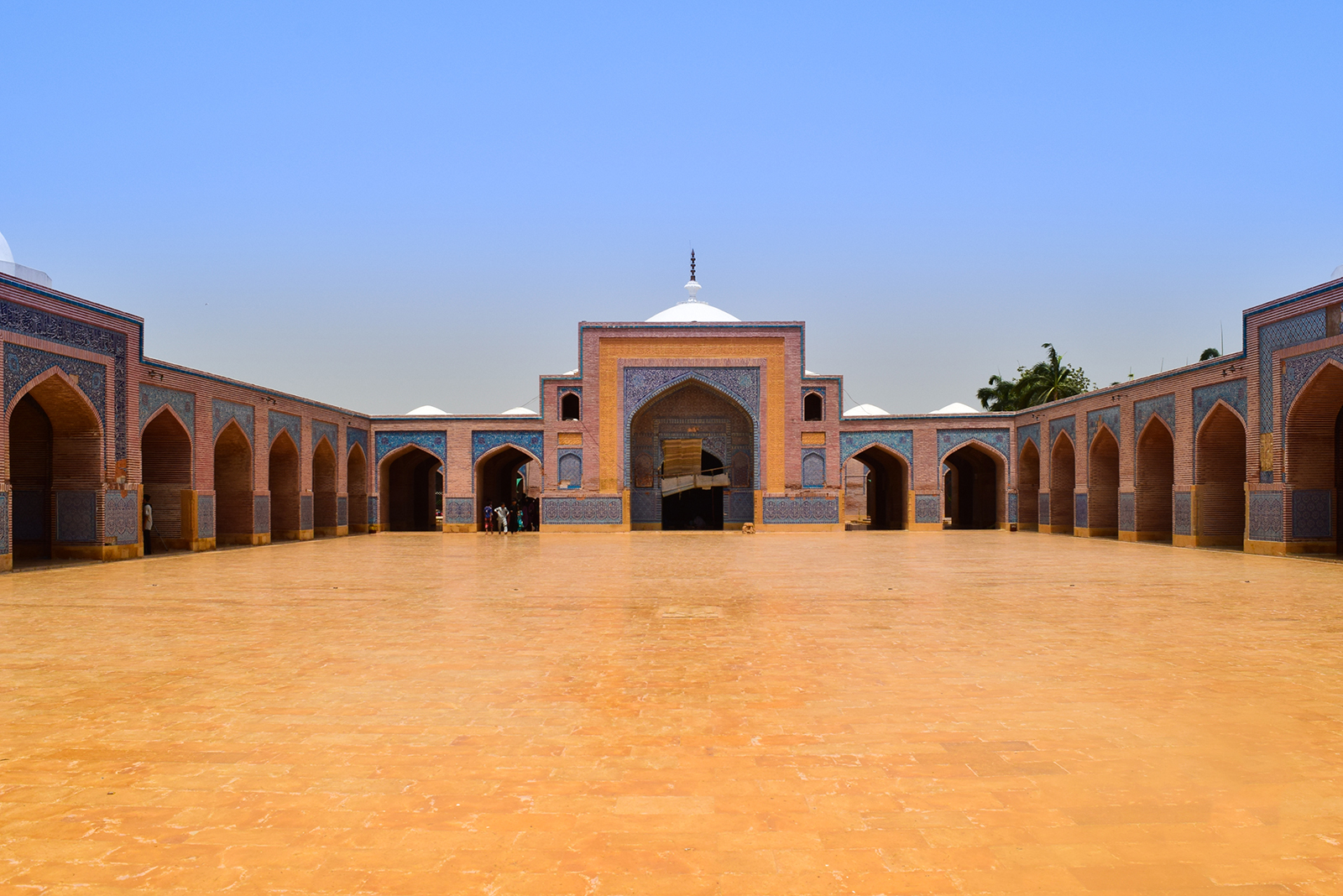
A view of the mosque's courtyard

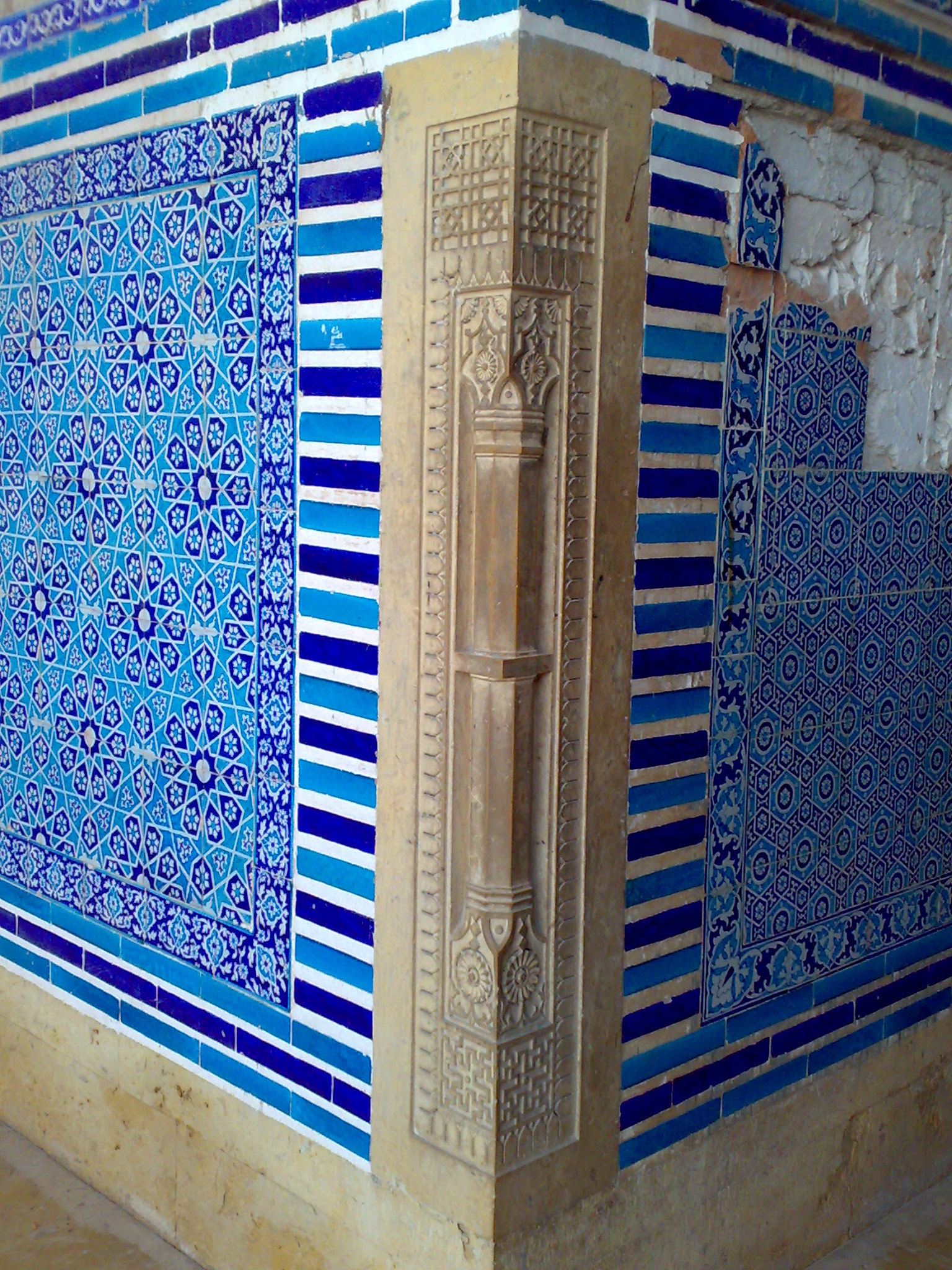
Pillar relief corner

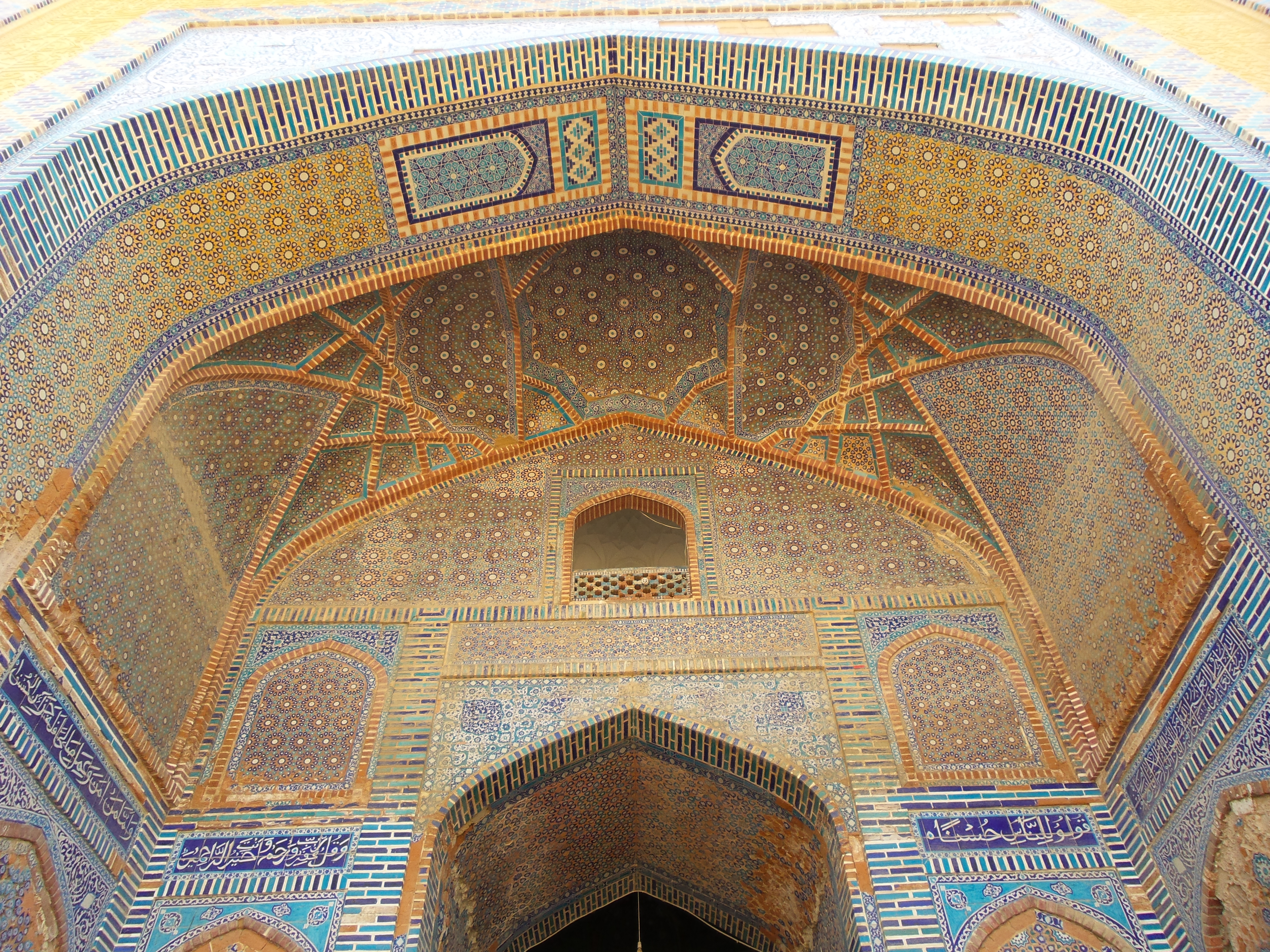
The mosque's iwans, or entry portals, are also decorated with tile work.

== See also ==
- List of mosques in Pakistan
- Wazir Khan Mosque – another Shah Jahan period mosque, considered to be the most elaborately decorated Mughal mosque.
