= Humayun Mosque =

Mosque in Agra, Uttar Pradesh, India

- Location of the former mosque in Uttar Pradesh

Religion
- Affiliation: Islam (former)
- Ecclesiastical or organisational status: Mosque (former)
- Status: Abandoned (partial ruinous state)

Location
- Location: Kachhpura, Agra, Fatehabad, Uttar Pradesh
- Country: India
- Administration: Archaeological Survey of India
- Coordinates: 27°10′57″N 78°02′22″E

Architecture
- Type: Mosque architecture
- Style: Mughal
- Founder: Humayun
- Funded by: Shaikh Zain of Khaf
- Completed: 937 AH (1530/1531 CE)

Specifications
- Dome: Three (maybe more)
- Inscriptions: Two
- Materials: Brick; limestone; stucco; glazed tiles

Monument of National Importance
- Official name: Humayun Masjid
- Reference no.: N-UP-A52
- Location of the former mosque in Agra

The Humayun Mosque, also known as the Kachpura Masjid and as the Humayun Masjid, is a former mosque, in a partial ruinous state, located in the village of Kachhpura in Agra, Fatehabad, in the state of Uttar Pradesh, India on the left bank of River Yamuna.

The former mosque is a Monument of National Importance, administered by the Archaeological Survey of India.

== History ==
Though the former mosque was not been mentioned in texts related to the Mughal era, it is the only monument in Agra that can undoubtedly be attributed to the reign of Humayun. According to one inscription on the mosque, the mosque was constructed in 937 AH (1530/1531 CE), (Note: One source claims that the mosque was built in 1565 CE by Haji Begum, a wife of Akbar, in memory of her father, Mirza Ghiyas Beg, and that the mosque was named after Akbar's father, Humayun.) when Humayun ascended the throne. According to another inscription, in Nastaliq characters, it named Shaikh Zain of Khaf, a scholar and a friend of Babur, as the person who commissioned construction of the mosque.

It is claimed that the mosque was built on the site of a former Jain temple; and that the former mosque was designed by Mirak Mirza Ghiyas, a famous Mughal architect.

== Architecture ==
The façade of the former mosque bears five arches, the central of which is a high iwan. A dome tops the central nave, and is supported on kite-shaped pendentives and net squinches. There are double-aisled wings on either side of the central nave. The smaller domes of the side wings had similar supports. The building is made of brick and limestone, (Note: One source claims it was built of red sandstone.) and covered with stucco work. The former mosque is in ruins, with only the main prayer hall intact. The southern wing has collapsed entirely making it difficult to determine how many bays originally composed the double-aisled north and south wings. It is thought that the side wings were once covered with eight cupolas. Influenced by Timurid architecture, the arch of the central bay is twice the width of the two arches flanking it.

== See also ==
- Islam in India
- List of mosques in India
- List of Monuments of National Importance in Agra district
  - Gyarah Sidhi
  - Mehtab Bagh
