= List of tourist attractions in Aurangabad =

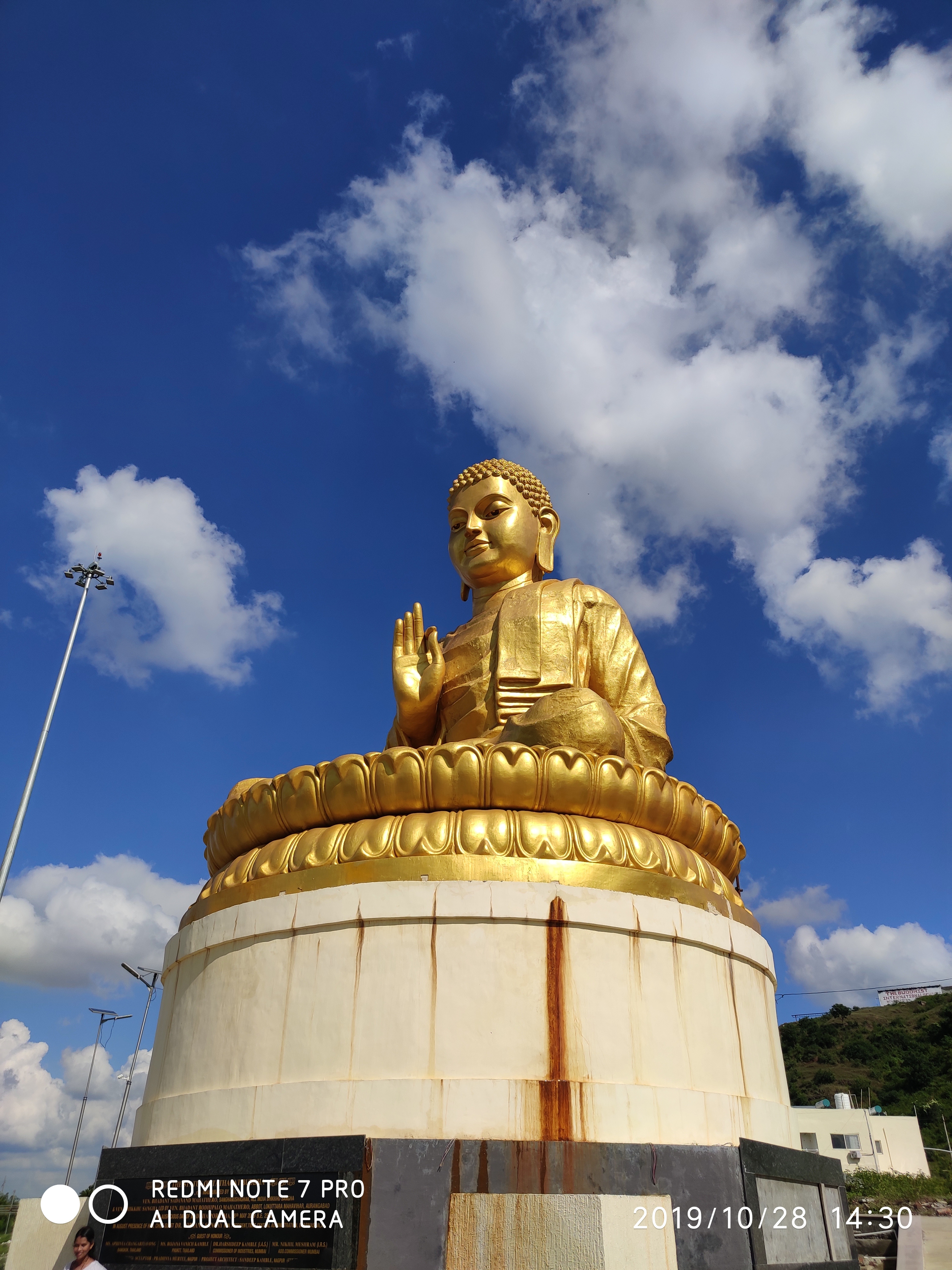
Buddha statue at Lokuttara Mahavihara in Chauka, Aurangabad

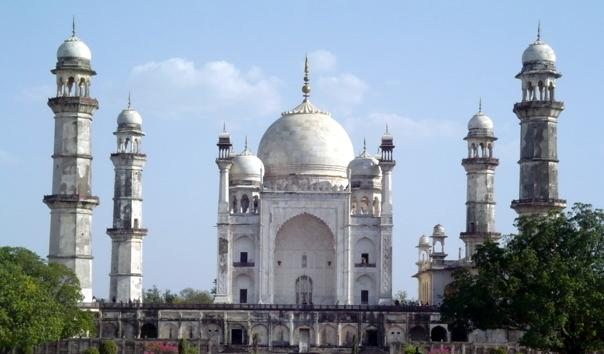
Bibi Ka Maqbara

Aurangabad is a historic city in the Maharashtra state of India. The city is a tourist hub, surrounded by many historical monuments, including the Ajanta Caves and Ellora Caves, which are UNESCO World Heritage Sites, as well as Bibi Ka Maqbara and Panchakki. The administrative headquarters of the Aurangabad Division or Marathwada region, Aurangabad, is said to be a City of Gates and the strong presence of these can be felt as one drive through the city. In 2010, the Maharashtra Tourism Minister declared Aurangabad to be the tourism capital of Maharashtra. It is also one of the fastest-growing cities in the world.

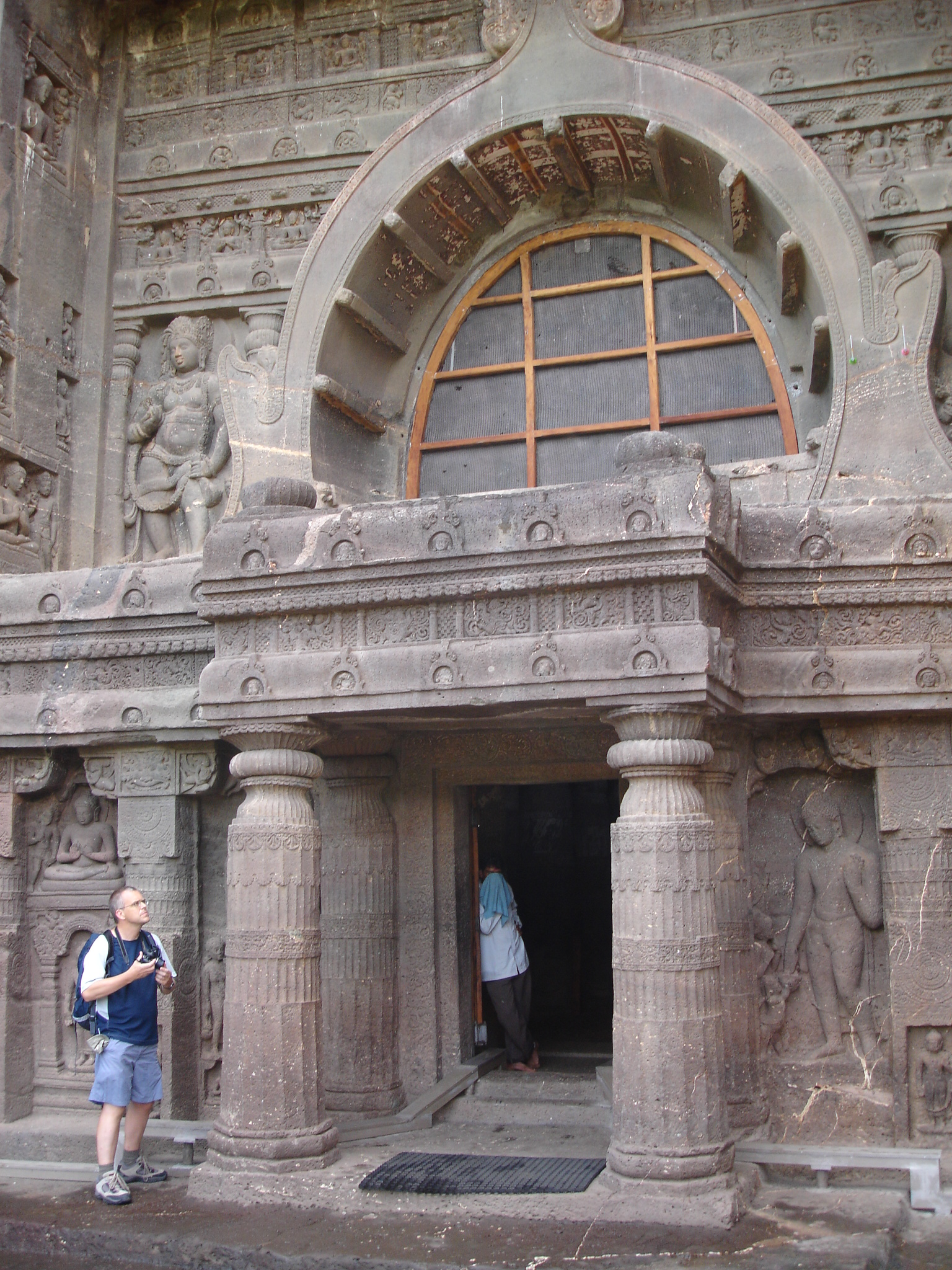
Ajanta Caves

== History of Aurangabad ==
The city was founded in 1610 by Malik Ambar, the Prime Minister of Murtaza. Nizam Shah of Ahmadnagar on the site of a village called Khadki. He made it his capital and the men of his army raised their dwellings around it. Within a decade, Khadki grew into a populous and imposing city. Malik Ambar died in 1626. He was succeeded by his son Fateh Khan who changed the name of Khadki to Fatehnagar. With the capture of Daulatabad in 1633, the Nizam Shahi dominions, including Fatehnagar, came under the possession of the Mughals. In 1653 when Prince Aurangzeb was appointed the viceroy of the Deccan for the second time, he made Fatehnagar his capital and called it Aurangabad.

== Tourist attractions in the city ==
See also: Gates in Aurangabad

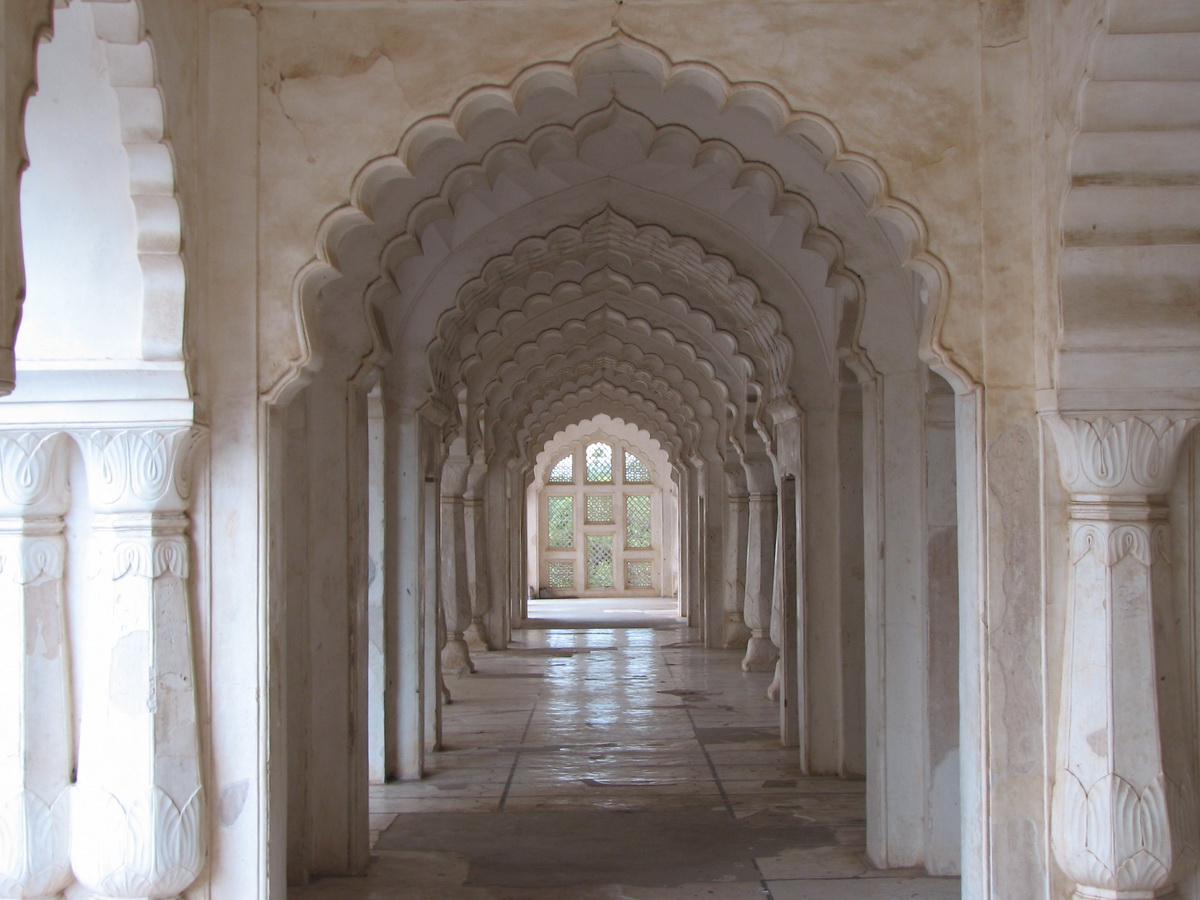
Bibi Ka Maqbara, inside view

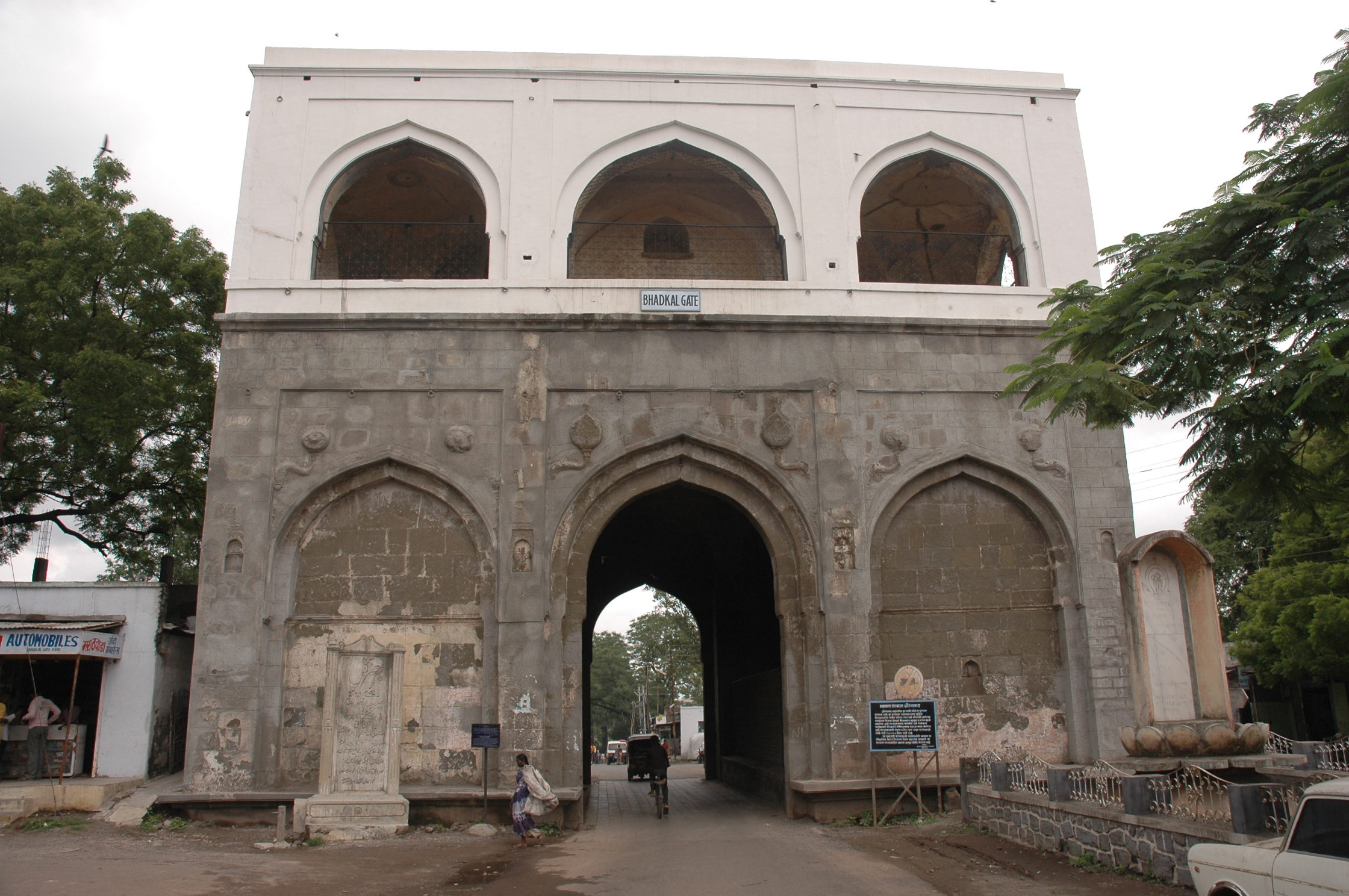
Bhadkal Gate, built by Malik Ambar in commemoration of his victory against the Mughals

- Bibi Ka Maqbara: Situated about 3 km from the city is Bibi Ka Maqbara, the burial place of Aurangzeb's wife, Rabia-ud-Durrani. It is an imitation of the Taj Mahal at Agra, and, due to its similar design, it is popularly known as the Mini Taj of the Deccan. The Maqbara stands in the middle of a spacious and formally planned Mughal garden with axial ponds, fountains, water channels, broad pathways and pavilions. Behind the mausoleum is a small archaeological museum.
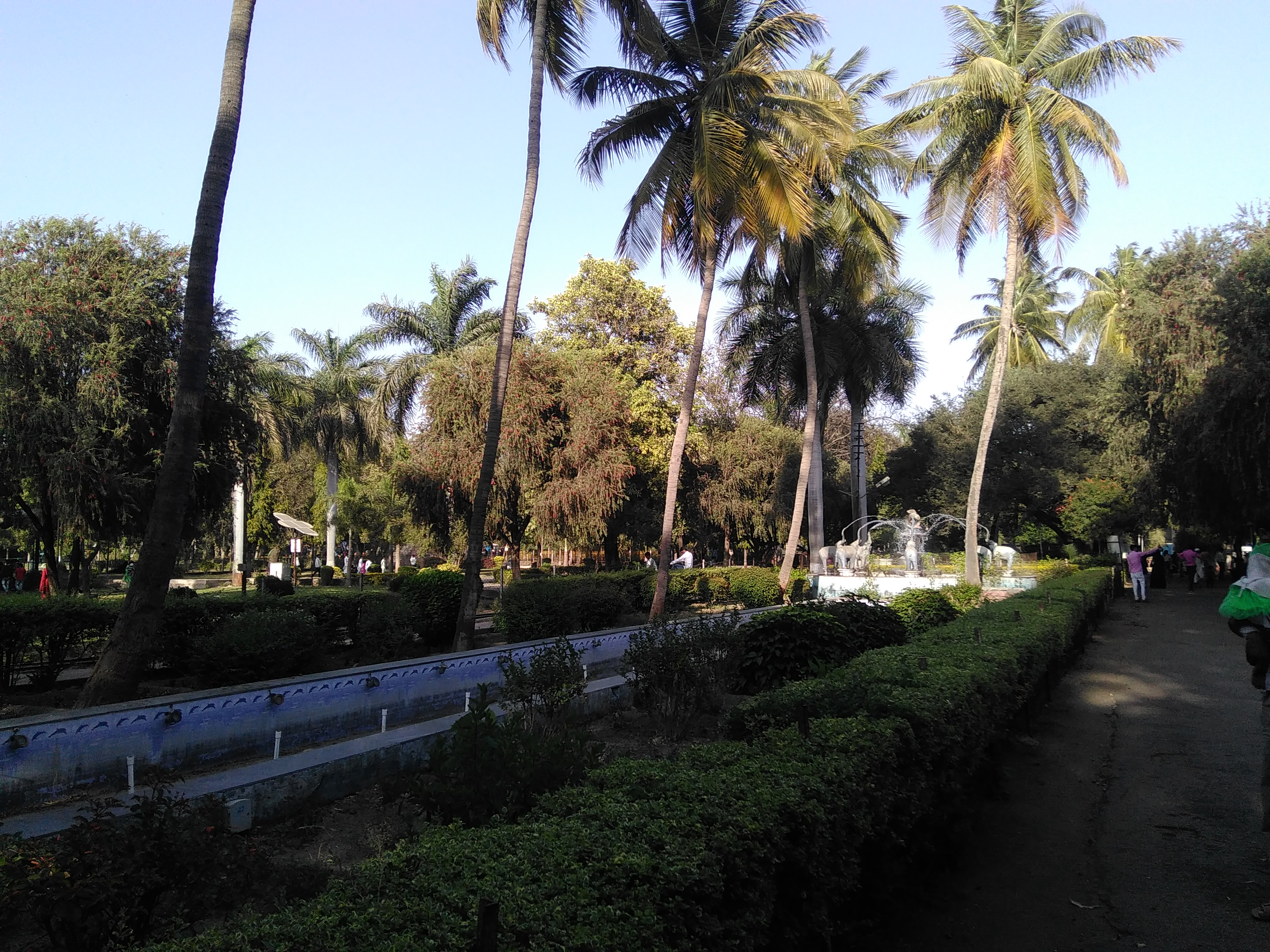
Siddharth Garden and Zoo

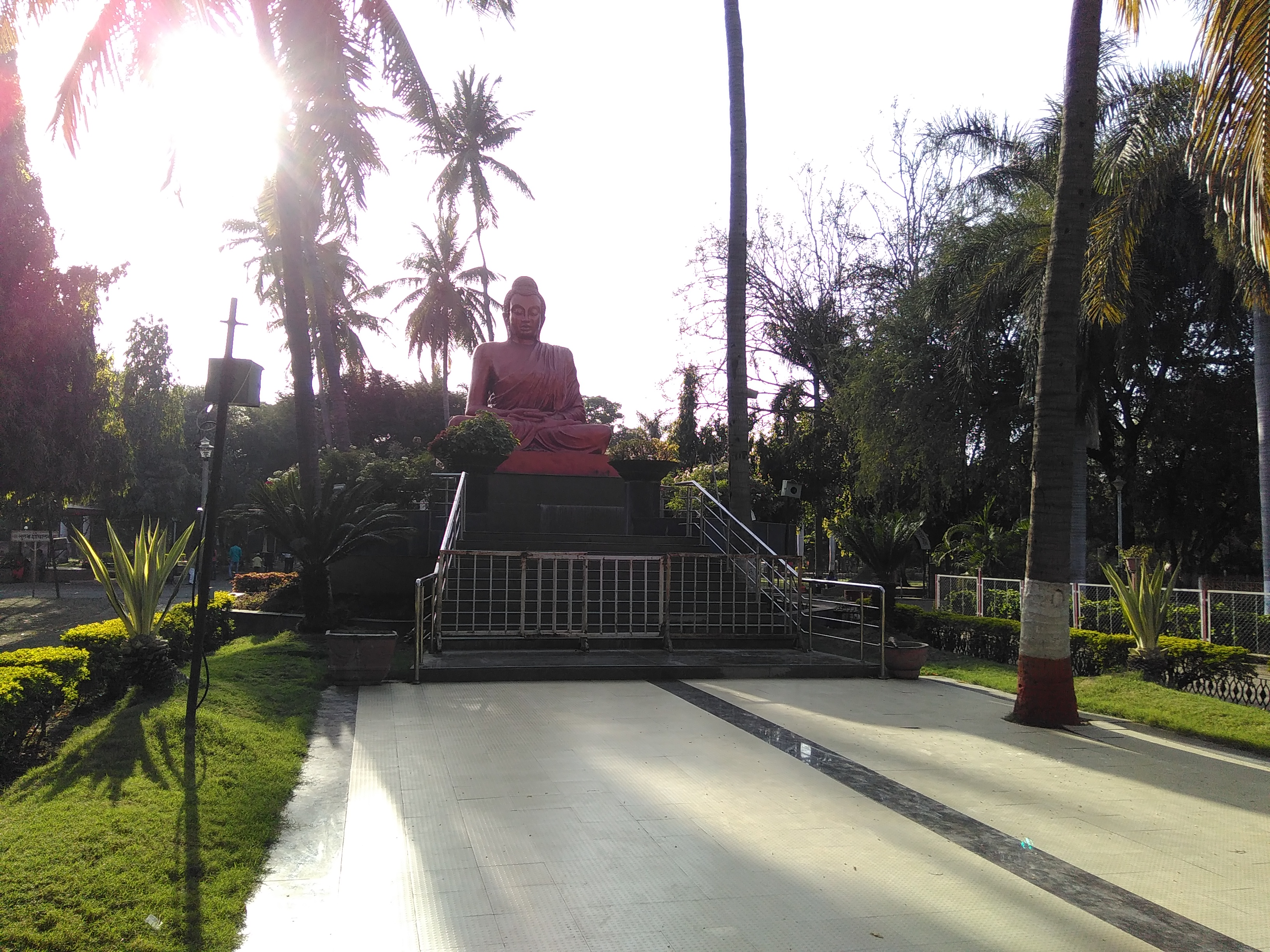
The Buddha statue in Siddhartha Garden and Zoo
- Siddharth Garden and Zoo: is a park and zoo situated near the central bus station in Aurangabad. This is the only zoo in the Marathwada region. There are various types of animals and birds. The name "Siddhartha" has been kept in the name of Gautama Buddha.

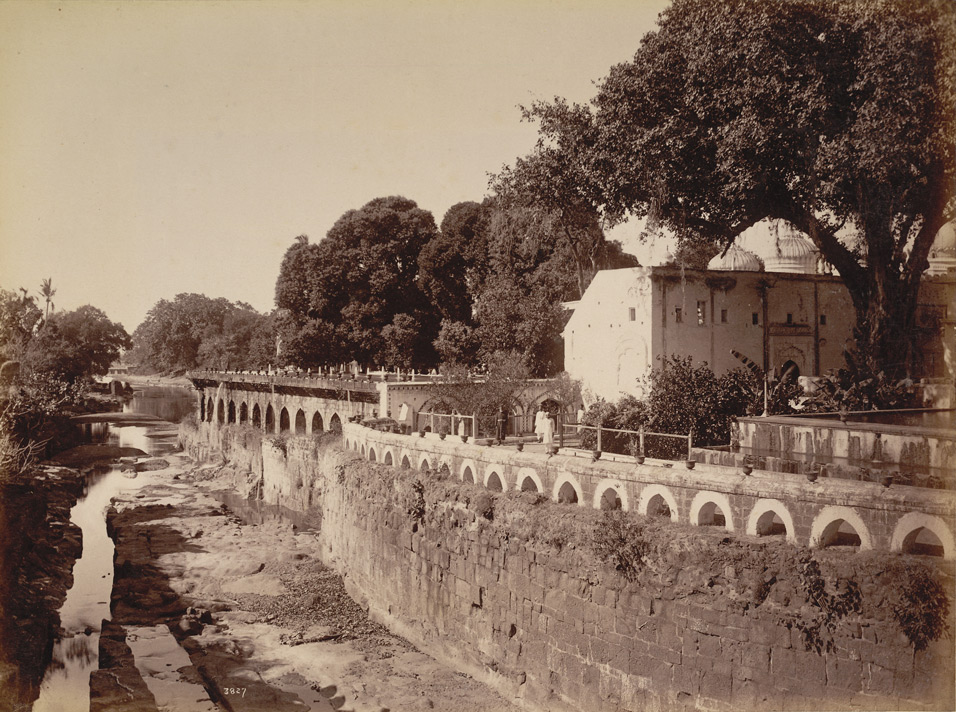
Panchakki, Baba Shah Mosafar Dargah, 1880s

- Panchakki (water mill): Housed in the Dargah complex of Baba Shah Musafir, this is a 17th-century water mill situated at a distance of 1 km from the city. An intriguing water mill, the Panchakki is famous for its underground water channel, which traverses more than 8 km to its source away in the mountains. The channel culminates in an artificial waterfall that powers the mill.
- Gates in Aurangabad: One of the things that make Aurangabad stand out from the several other medieval cities in India are its 52 'gates', each of which has a local history, or had individuals linked with them. Not many people are aware that Aurangabad is also known as the 'City of Gates'.
- Naukhanda palace: This was built by Malik Ambar in 1616 upon the summit of a rising ground at Aurangabad. The massive portal gateway leading to this, over which the Naubatkhana sounded, was called Barkal. The palace had nine apartments. The interior buildings consisted of five zenanas, a public and private audience hall, a mosque and a throne room, each provided with a garden and a cistern.

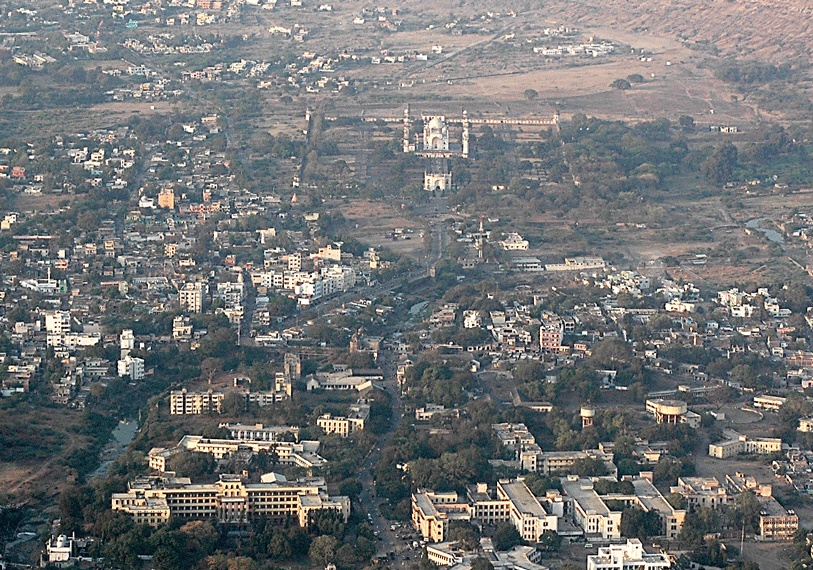
Bibi Ka Maqbara, aerial view

- Himayat Baugh Aurangabad: This is a 17th-century garden that now houses the Fruit Research Station & Nursery, which is a part of the Marathwada Agricultural University. It is located near Delhi Gate in the Rauza Bagh area of Aurangabad. It is a sprawling complex spread over 300 acres (1.2 km^{2}), it is naturally green, and in the olden days it was known as the Mughal garden.

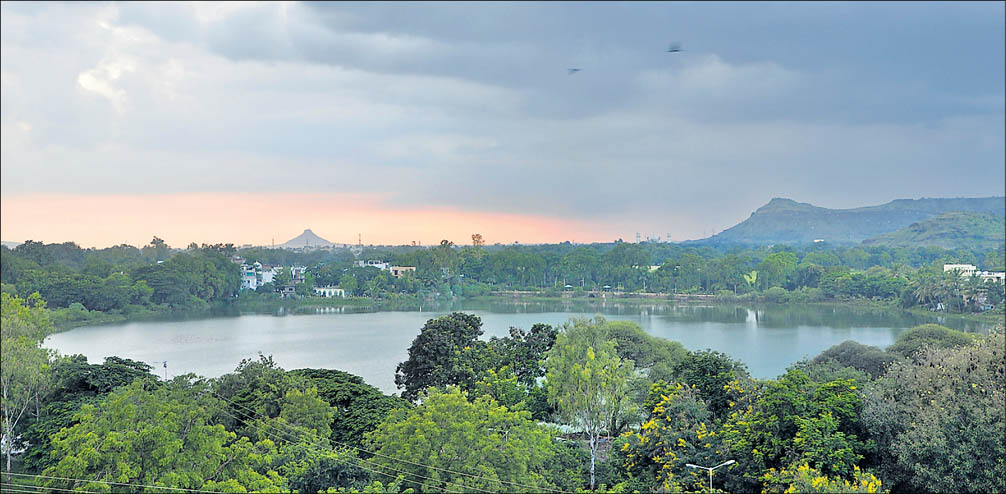
Salim Ali Lake

- Salim Ali Lake & Bird Sanctuary: Salim Ali Sarovar (lake), popularly known as Salim Ali Talab, is located near Delhi Gate, opposite Himayat Bagh, Aurangabad. It is located in the northern part of the city. During the Mughal period it was known as Khiziri Talab. It was renamed after the great ornithologist and naturalist Salim Ali. It also has a bird sanctuary and a garden maintained by the Aurangabad Municipal Corporation.
- Aurangabad Caves: Situated at a distance of 5 km, nestled amidst the hills are 12 Buddhist caves probably dating back to 3 A.D. Of particular interest are the Tantric influences evident in the iconography and architectural designs of the caves. They also offer a panoramic view of the city as well as the imposing Maqbara.
- Quila-E-Ark: In 1692, Aurangzeb ordered a palace to be built and named it the Killa Arrak. The space enclosed by the Killa Arrak or citadel covered nearly the whole ground between the Mecca and Delhi gates of the city. It had four or five gateways and a nagarkhana for the musicians. The walls were battle-mented and loop-holed, and had semi-circular towers at the angles, on which guns were once mounted. The inner portion was occupied by recesses similar to those in the city walls. To the right of the entrance was a high terrace extending the whole length of the ground enclosed.
- Kali Masjid, Jama Masjid: Among the mosques, the Jumma Masjid and the Kali Masjid, built by Malik Ambar, and the Shah Ganj mosque, are the most conspicuous. Malik Ambar is said to have built seven mosques which go by the general name of Kali Masjid. The Kali Masjid is in the Juna Bazar area and was erected in 1600 A. D. It is a six-pillared stone-building standing on a high plinth. The Jumma Masjid of Malik Ambar is near the Killa Arrak. It has fifty polygonal pillars arranged in five rows, connected by a system of arches, which divide the building into twenty-seven equal compartments, each covered by a domical vault of a simple but elegant design. There are nine pointed arches in front. Of these, five were erected by Malik Ambar in 1612 A.D. and the remaining four were added by Aurangzeb.
- Shahganj Masjid: Occupying the great market square of Aurangabad is the large Shah Ganj mosque, one of the finest edifices of its class to be found in any part of India. It was built in about 1720 A.D. Khafi Khan, the author of Muntakhab-al Lubab, referring to Sayyad Husain Khan's viceroyalty of the Deccan (1714–1719) says "the reservoir at Shah Ganj was begun by Sayyad Husain Ali, and although Aazu-d Daula Iraz Khan enlarged and made higher the buildings and mosques, still Sayyad Husain Ali was the originator of that extensive reservoir, which in summer when water is scarce, relieves the sufferings of the inhabitants".

The mosque is on a raised platform, and has shops on three of the outer sides; while the fourth or the north side is open and is ascended by a flight of steps. The facade represents an arcade of five scalloped arches, constructed in the Indo-Saracenic style, and supported on stone pillars. This portion projects a little; and the interior contains twenty-four pillars, which with six pilasters in the back wall, are arranged in the form of a square. The central portion is covered with a graceful bulbous dome, having the base adorned with crisp crinkled lotus leaves tied in a neat narrow band; and the apex bears an elegant spire. Arcaded monasteries called Kham Khas form the east and the west wings, and consist of five arches on either side, constructed like the arches of the main building, but of horizontal structure. The interior is connected by horizontal arches; and the roof is formed of a series of little domes, each supported on four pillars. There are minarets at the corners of the main building, and at the end angels of the Kham Khas. The courtyard in front contains two large cisterns. The entrance is in the form of a little mosque, with a pointed arch and two minarets.

- Chowk Masjid: In 1655 was Chauk Masjid built by Shayista Khan, the maternal uncle of Aurangzeb. Its front has five pointed arches, and is two arches in depth. These are connected with one another by eight pillars and corresponding pilasters, and support five domes. The central dome, with a metallic spire is lofty, while the others are concealed in the roof. The corners are decorated with minarets. The whole structure has a high basement containing chambers used for shops, which open out on the roadside. The gate has two minarets. There is a cistern in the courtyard in front of the mosque.
- Pir Ismail Mausoleum: Outside the Delhi gate along the Harsul road, in a garden, is a mausoleum to Pir Ismail. Though principally in the Moghul style of architecture, it shows some features common to Pathan architecture. It is said to have been erected in memory of Pir Ismail, a tutor to Prince Aurangzeb. The garden also contains several ruined cisterns and fountains. The gate is rather imposing and has a large pointed archway, forming a sort of portico. The actual entrance is through a small arch at the further extremity. The parapet is nearly ornamented, and so is the facade, which has three small windows with pointed arches, beside recesses. Each corner of the terrace has a little tower surmounted by a bulbous dome and a spire. The mausoleum is square in plan, and has five pointed arches on each side and similar domed towers at the corners. The interior is connected by a system of arches, corresponding with those on the sides and carrying a series of little domes.
- Sunehri Mahal: The Sunehri Mahal in Paharsingpura was erected by a Bundelkhand chief who accompanied Aurangzeb into the Deccan. The building is in stone and lime, and has a high plinth. It is said to have derived its name from the paintings of gold which at one time decorated it.

== Tourist attractions in Aurangabad District ==
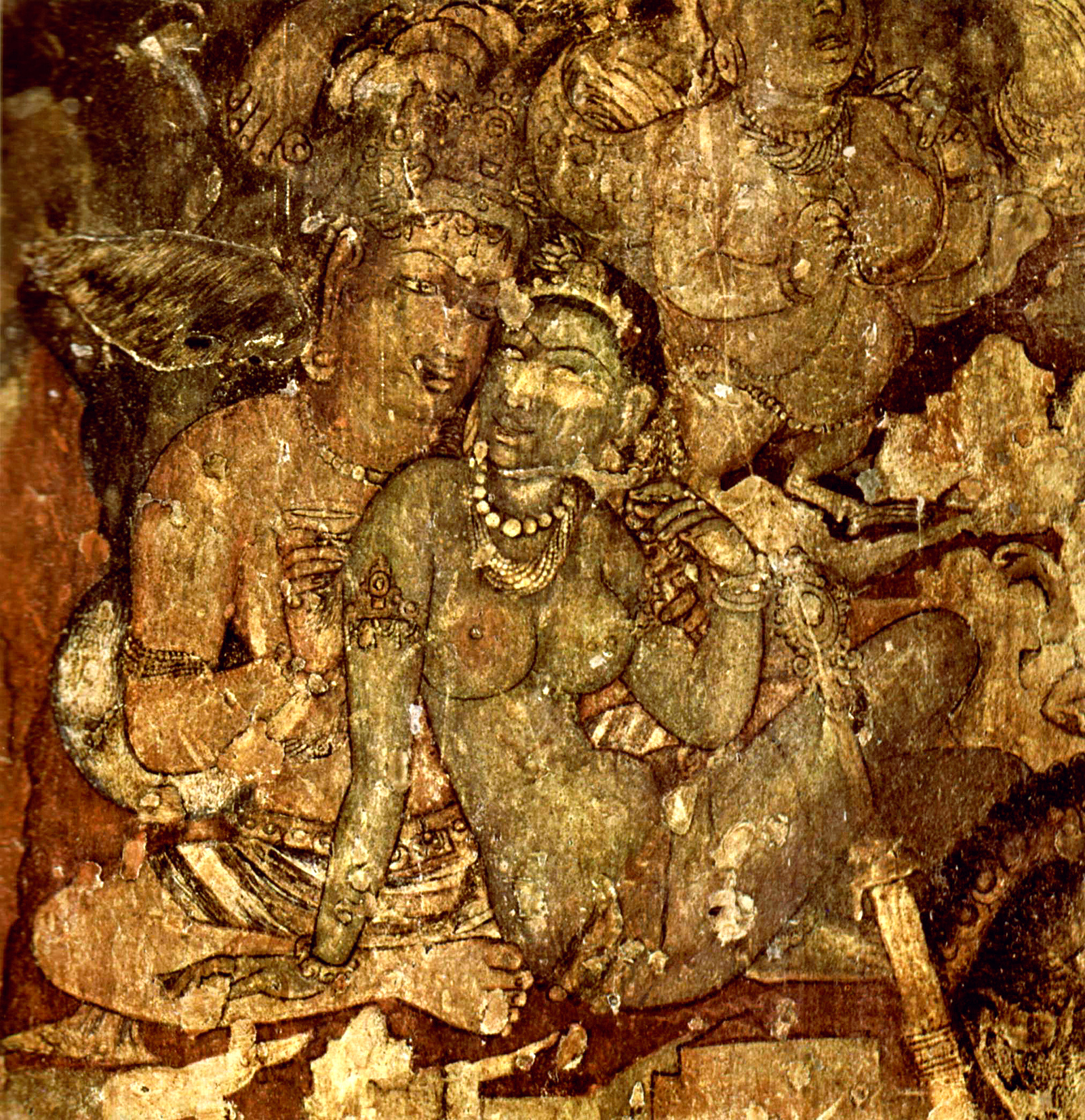
Painting from the Ajanta caves

- Ajanta Caves: The Ajanta Caves are 31 rock-cut cave monuments which date from the 2nd century BC. The caves include paintings and sculptures considered to be masterpieces of both Buddhist religious art (which depict the Jataka tales) as well as frescos which are reminiscent of the Sigiriya paintings in Sri Lanka.

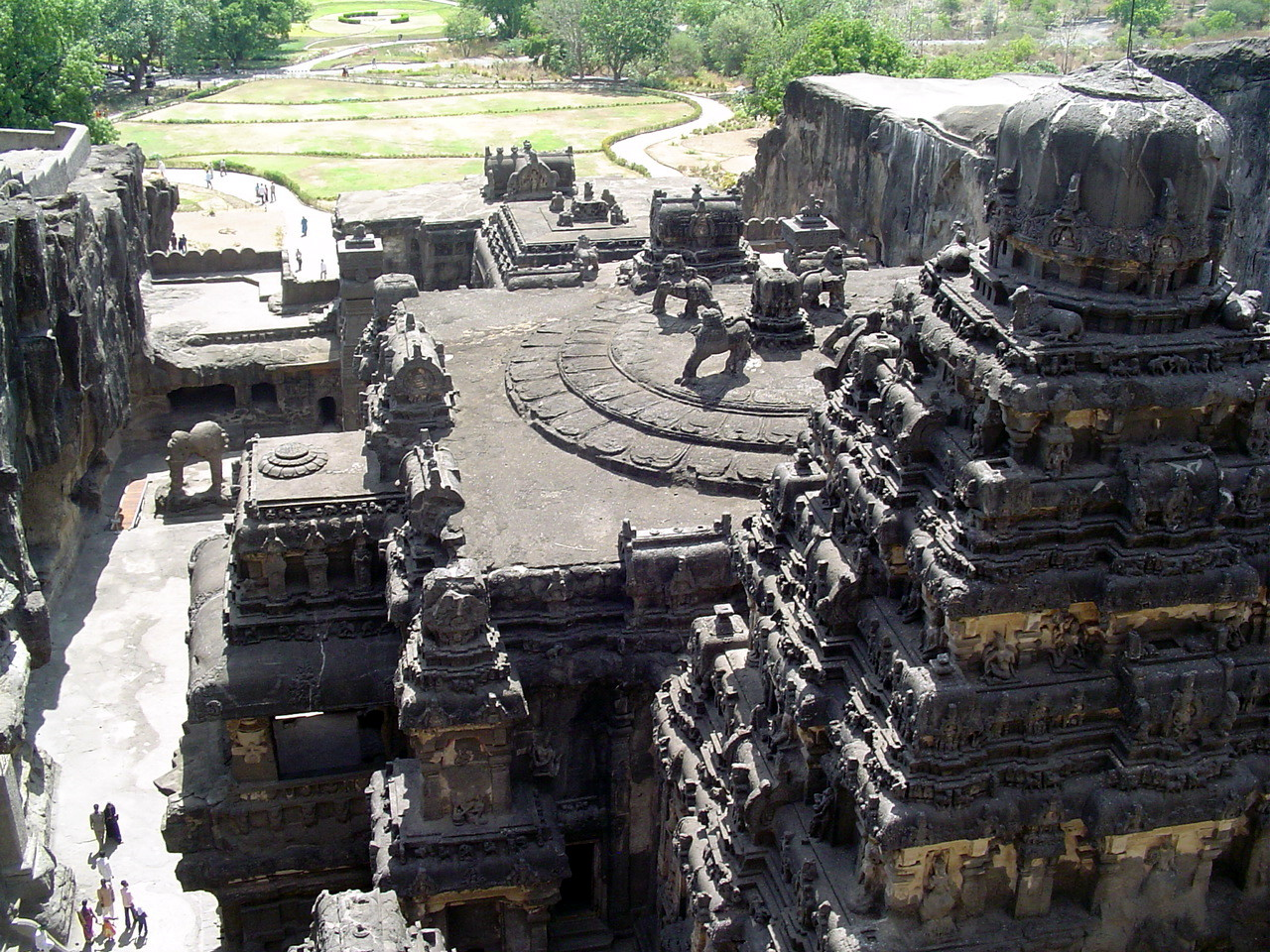
Kailasha temple at Ellora

- Ellora Caves: Ellora is an archaeological site, 30 km (19 mi) built by the Rashtrakuta rulers. Well known for its monumental caves, Ellora is a World Heritage Site. Ellora represents the epitome of Indian rock-cut architecture. The 34 "caves", actually structures excavated out of the vertical face of the Charanandri hills, being Buddhist, Hindu and Jain rock-cut temples and monasteries, were built between the 5th and 10th centuries.

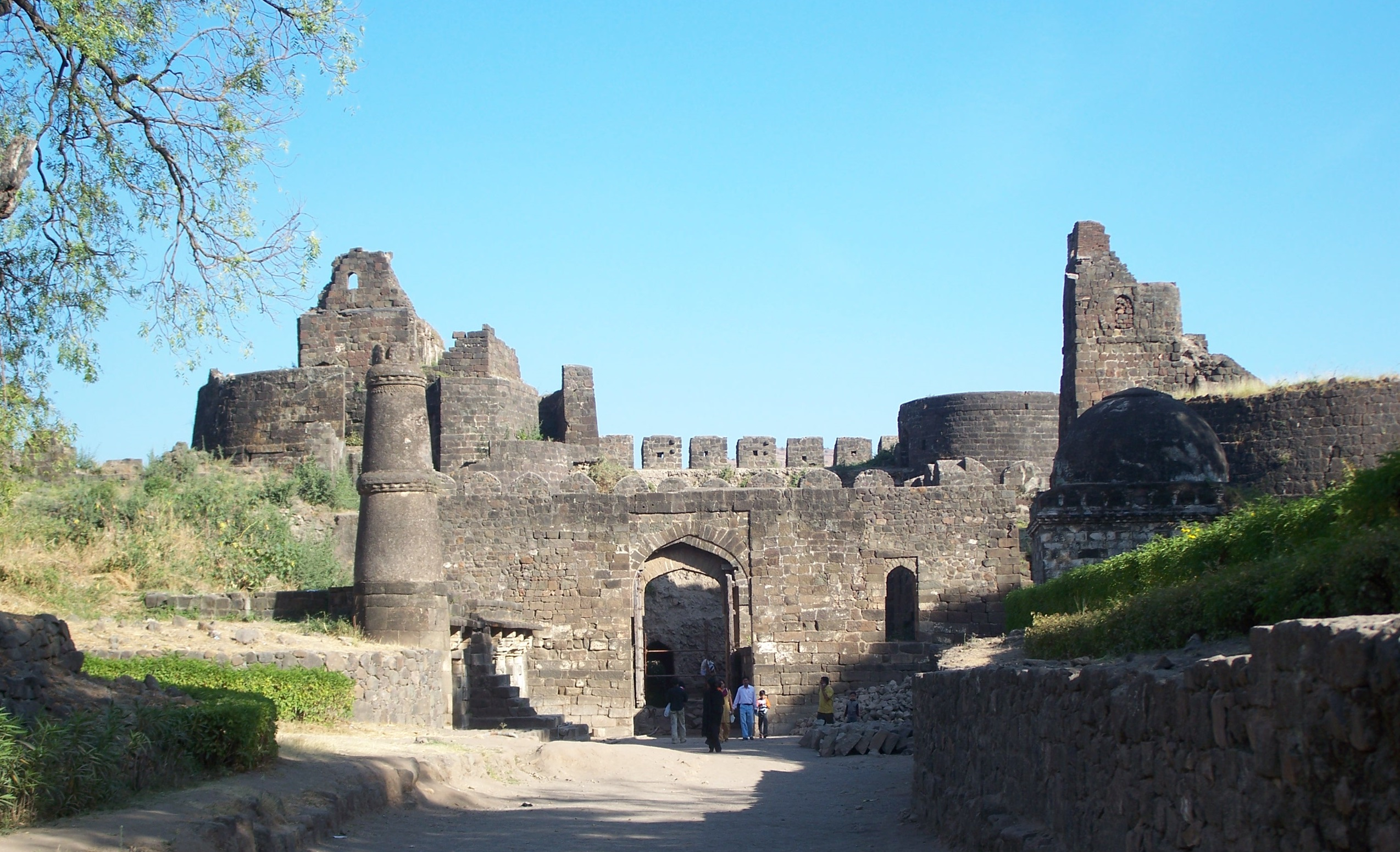
Daulatabad (Deogiri) Fort

- Daulatabad Fort: Daulatabad, meaning "City of Prosperity", is a 14th-century fort city in Maharashtra, about 16 kilometers northwest of Aurangabad. The place was once as known as Deogiri. Starting in 1327, it famously remained the capital of the Tughlaq dynasty, under Muhammad bin Tughluq (r. 1325–1351), who also changed its name, and forcibly moved the entire population of Delhi here for two years, before it was abandoned due to lack of water.

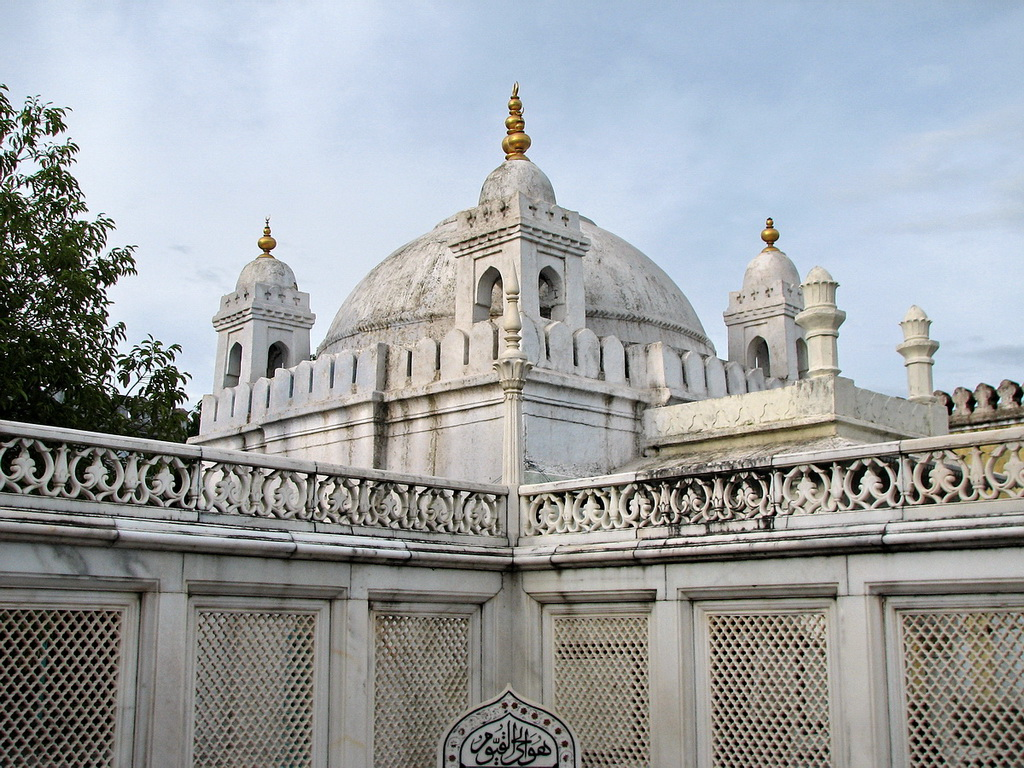
Zainuddin Shirzai Dargah Khuldabad

- Khuldabad: Khuldabad, also Kuldabad or Khultabad, is a city (municipal council) and a Taluka of Aurangabad district. Initially it was known as Rauza, meaning garden of paradise. It is known as the Valley of Saints, or the Abode of Eternity, because in the 14th century, several Sufi saints chose to reside here. The dargah of Zar Zari Zar Baksh, Shaikh Burhan ud-din Gharib Chisti and Shaikh Zain-ud-din Shirazi along with the tomb of the Mughal emperor Aurangzeb and his trusted general Qamar-ud-din Khan, Asaf Jah I the first Nizam of Hyderabad are located in this town.
- Grishneshwar: Grishneshwar, also known as Ghushmeshwar, is a famous Hindu temple dedicated to Lord Shiva and is one of the twelve Jyotirlingas, the sacred abodes of Shiva. The temple is located eleven km from Daulatabad Fort, near Aurangabad The temple is located near Ellora Caves.
- Jayakwadi Dam: The Jayakwadi project is one of the largest irrigation projects in Maharashtra. It is a multipurpose project. Its water is used mainly to irrigate agricultural land in the drought-prone Marathwada region of Maharashtra. It also provides water for drinking and industrial usage to nearby towns and villages and to the municipalities and industrial areas of Aurangabad and Jalna. The surrounding area of the dam has a garden and a bird sanctuary.
- Dnyneshwar Udyan: Dnyaneshwar Udyan is the largest garden in Maharashtra, resembling the Vrindavan Gardens of Mysore, situated on the banks of Nathsagar Lake which formed due to Jayakwadi Dam. It is located in the ancient town of Paithan, 40 km south of Aurangabad. Out of the 125 hectares, orchards cover 26 hectares, 28 are laid out as parks, and 15 hectares of floriculture.
- Pitalkhora Caves: Pitalkhora in the Satamala range of the Sahyadri hills are of great interest. There are thirteen caves, set high up on the hill, overlooking picturesque ravines. Many of the caves have crumbled and are badly damaged. Because of its remoteness, Pitalkhora has few visitors. The caves, which date back to the 2nd century BC, are only 40 km away from the Ellora Caves at Aurangabad. One can see here many unusual sculptures like Yaksa figures. The main gate has a wide terrace, with the naga and guardians flanking the door, and a row of elephants decorate the complex. A stair directly connects the entrance to the chaitya. A group of viharas, a chaitya hall, and two smaller caves across the gorge with stupas make up the complex.
- Gautala Sanctuary: Gautala Sanctuary is located 65 km from Aurangabad. It was declared a protected area in 1986, has an area of over 250 km^{2}, and is located at a height of 700 feet. Spread in the hill ranges of Sahyadri, the diversified vegetation scattered intermittently supports rich faunal and floral diversity. This habitat is particularly good for sloth bears and resident and migratory birds. Other wildlife population includes chinkara, bat, wild boar, jungle cat, monkey, civet cat, barking deer, fox, jackal, langur, leopard, nilgai and wolf. Cranes, spoonbills, storks, ibis, pochards, peafowl, quail, partridges, and various species of waders are some of the bird species found here.
- Kaghzipura: A place situated near Daulatabad made the first handmade paper in India after the technology was brought here by Mongol invaders. It is a landmark even today. This paper has been used to print the Quran.
- Mhaismal: Mhaismal is a small hill station in Aurangabad District of Maharashtra. Located at an altitude of 1067 m, it is about 12 km from Khuldabad and about 40 km from Aurangabad. Places of tourist interest are an ancient temple of Girijamata, a lake and a 300 ft TV tower which can broadcast for a 150 km range. An exact copy of the Balaji Temple at Tirupati is located at the top of the hill station. The hill station attracts visitors during monsoons when it is covered in greenery, and it offers a fantastic view of the surrounding valleys.
- Adrenaline the Adventure Camp: Sharnapur is a small village in Aurangabad District of Maharashtra. Located at an altitude of 1067 m, it is about 12 km from Khuldabad and about 10 km from Aurangabad. It offers all-terrain vehicles, parasailing, tandem paramotoring, golf, and laser tag.

== Excursions outside Aurangabad District ==
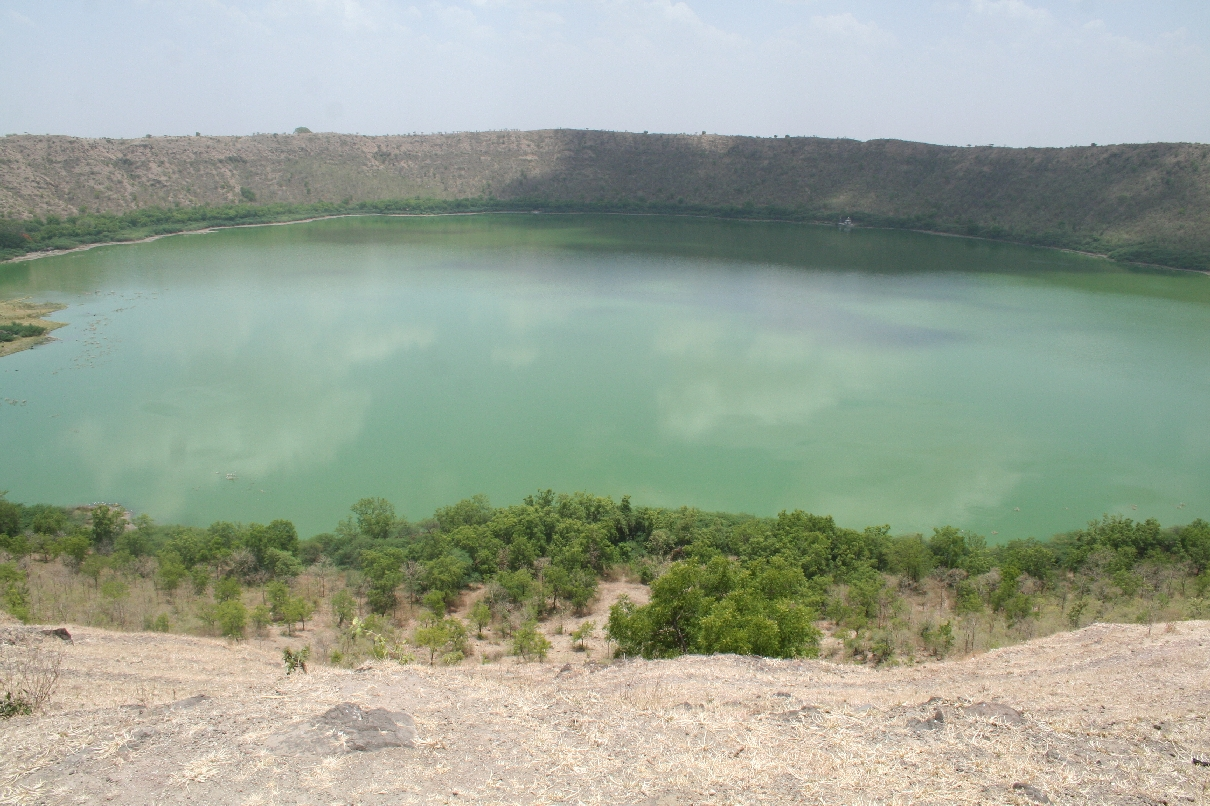
Lonar crater

- Lonar crater lake: Although located in the Buldana district of Maharashtra, it is mostly accessed by tourists from Aurangabad. Lonar is the world's third largest crater. It has its genesis nearly 50,000 years ago, when a two million-ton meteorite impacted the earth to create a depression 1.83 kilometers in diameter and 150 meters deep. Lonar Lake is a saltwater lake, which was created by a meteor hitting the Earth during the Pleistocene Epoch. The impact crater thereby formed is the only hypervelocity meteoritic impact crater on basalt rock. A lake that evolved in the resulting basaltic rock formation, it is both saline and alkaline in nature.
- Rohilagad Caves: Rohilagad is a town 44 km away from aurangabad and 45 km away from Jalna. Three caves in Rohilagad contain Hindu religious sculptures dating back to the Satavahana era.

== See also ==
- Outline of tourism in India
