= Neher water system =

Water supply network in Aurangabad, India

Neher water system provided clean water for the people of Aurangabad and its suburbs. It was created by Malik Ambar who founded the town under the name Khadki and was later expanded by Aurangzeb to facilitate the military activity that became prevalent under Mughal rule during the 17th century.

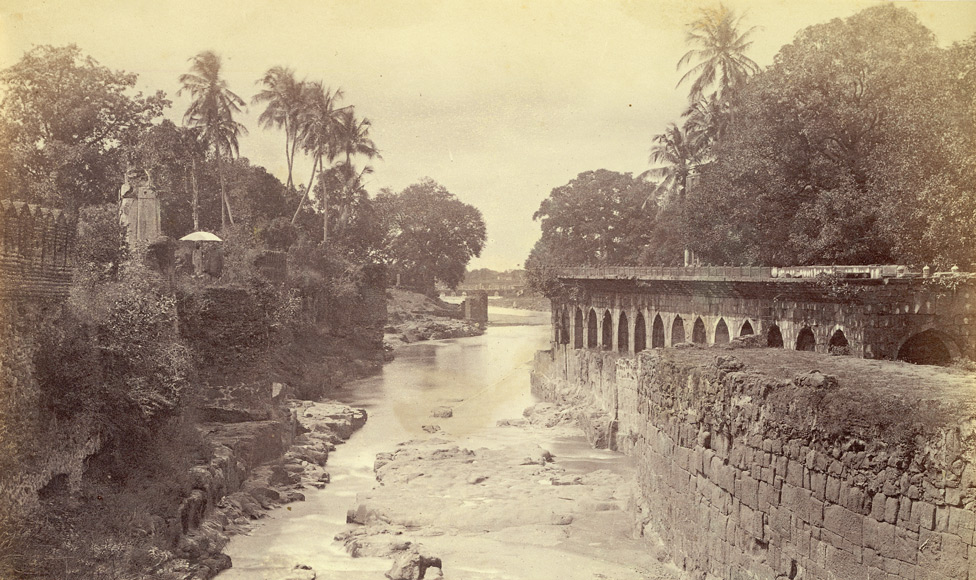
Kham river Aurangabad 1860s

== History ==
The first aqueduct in Aurangabad was designed in 1612 by Malik Ambar to address the shortage of water caused by the lack of reservoirs and natural water reserves in the area. Despite the surrounding landscape, which made it difficult to construct the aqueducts' supporting pillars, the construction went ahead.

The reason for the construction of the aqueduct was the discovery of a subterranean water supply in the mountainous valleys north of Aurangabad. The consequent construction of the waterway provided a stable water supply for a population of around seven lakhs (around seven hundred thousand people), with the city of Aurangabad receiving enough fresh water to prevent the shortages that had previously occurred. The aqueduct was named Khair-E-Jari. The construction of such aqueducts continued from 1612 until 1803 with two more aqueducts constructed by engineers such as Malik Ambar, Shah Mehmood of Panchakki, and Shah Ali Nahri.

Malik Ambar's design was not well received and it was described by Vazir Mullah Mohammad as imaginary and preposterous. However, Malik Ambar managed to construct it within fifteen months, at half the estimated cost.

== Mughal era water works ==
The Aurangabad Gazetteer of 1884 states: "The supply of water is abundant. The Ganda or Kham river washes the western walls and the Bayan Khan nalla passes through the center of the town. Besides these streams, aqueducts convey water from the hills utilizing stone conduits, and the supply is distributed through innumerable pipes and fountains. In Aurangzeb's time, a large marsh or tank extended the whole length of the northern wall, but the dampness proved unhealthy and he ordered the portion immediately in front of his palace to be filled in and converted into fields. The remainder is known as the Khizri talao and is just beyond the Delhi gate. The Kanval or Loti talao was fed by a spring and was confined in the hollow between the palace of Aurangzeb and the Mecca gate, but the band was purposely destroyed to save the town from being flooded."

The town of Aurangabad receives its water supply from springs or wells connected with small underground masonry pipes. The principal watercourses are fourteen in number, with the most important among them being the canal that drew its water from the river near Harsul.

== Nahr-e-Ambari water course ==
The city of Aurangabad had several water sources that supplied the city. These were deemed necessary as the city had a large military population to support.

The courses that have been recorded are:

1. A canal that branched at Gaumukh. One of these branches provided water to Shah Ganj and the surrounding area whilst the other branch passed the Barakul gate and provided water to the Naukonda palace, Juna bazaar and the suburbs of Chauk and Gul Mandi. One of the syphons has been damaged which is preventing water from flowing through it.
2. The Panchakki waterpipe began at a well which was situated above a junction between the Harsul river and a tributary. It provided water to the Panchakki reservoir.
3. The Begampura canal, the canal near the Mahomedan garden and the river in between the walls of Aurangabad and the Begampura suburb.
4. The Palsi water pipe originated from a well near the village of Palsi. The water was carried through a 252-foot long dam to a cistern, where it was then directed to the Baijipura suburb and the Sadar Talukdar garden. At present, the pipe is blocked with silt, with the result being that only a small amount of water can flow through in the wet season.
5. The Shah Ali Nahr commenced from a well near Devalgaon and supplies a cistern attached to the shrine of Shah Ali
6. An open irrigation channel takes water from a dam near the Aurangabad cantonment
7. A pipe from Suker supplied two areas with water.
8. Latchman Doss Bairagi's pipe, to the north of Baijapura
9. Lall Munkirar's pipe, which drew its water from a tank north of Baijipura
10. Dul Badul's pipe, near the village of Garkala. There was also a pipe that led from the same village and supplied water to the cavalry lines.
11. A small pipe which began at Chuasur gardens and also supplied the cavalry lines.
12. Two pipes, one of which began in the village of Devlai whilst the other began in the Sattara hills. These two pipes united south of the cavalry lines.

Of the watercourses listed above, four still supply water to the city of Aurangabad.

== Nizam era water works ==
The construction of the first modern water supply system began in 1932 at the request of the Nizam and was completed in 1933, for Rs. 35,50,00. (350,000 rupees) A settling tank with a capacity of 4.64 lakh (464,000) gallons was installed near the Gaumukh service reservoir and the distributary system was expanded.

Due to the rapidly increasing population, another water supply system was constructed for Rs. 30,56,579 (a little over 300,000 rupees). The Harsul and Kham rivers were tapped, a reservoir constructed in the Osmanpura area, a filtration system was installed to purify the water and the distributary system was enlarged (although there was a proposal to overhaul the entire system rather than enlarge it).

== See also ==
- Panchakki
- Neighborhoods of Aurangabad City
- Salim Ali Lake
- Himayat Bagh Aurangabad
