= Aurangabad CIDCO =

Planned city in India

Coordinates: 19°52′26.6″N 75°21′59.75″E

Aurangabad CIDCO (औरंगाबाद सिडको) is a planned city in Maharashtra state, India.

Indian politician Rafiq Zakaria contested the first election of the newly created Maharashtra state in 1962, from Aurangabad and was elected to Maharashtra assembly. He was made Minister for Urban Development in the new ministry. It was due to his efforts that planning for New Aurangabad was initiated. The responsibility for the new city was given to City and Industrial Development Corporation (CIDCO) which started development in the 1970s. Thus Aurangabad CIDCO was conceived and developed into a modern city.

New Aurangabad (as the project was known) is the second most successful project to be undertaken by CIDCO after Navi Mumbai.

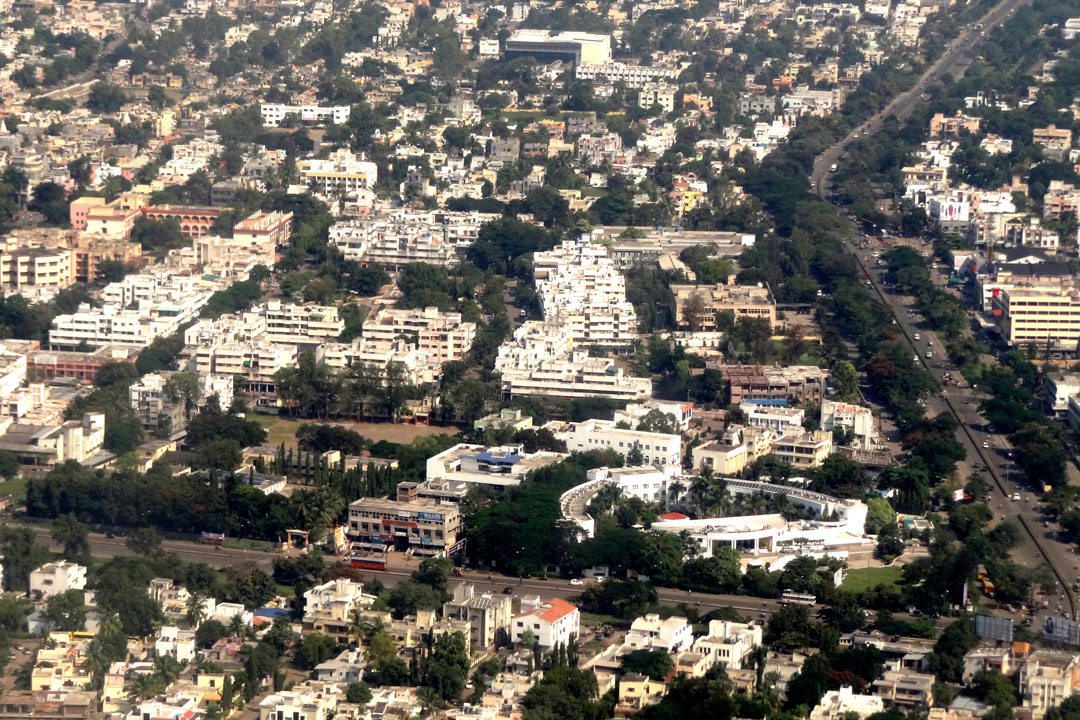
CIDCO Town Center CBD, Aerial view

== New Aurangabad ==
Planned and developed by CIDCO, New Aurangabad was inaugurated by then Prime Minister Indira Gandhi, who remarked: "The plans look very good on paper, let us see how it is implemented". She once visited the project after the implementation of the plan started, and also planted a tree at New Aurangabad, which is nurtured and maintained by CIDCO.

=== Neighbourhood ===
New Aurangabad city's localities are named as Neighbourhood-One (N-1), Neighbourhood-Two (N-2) through N-15. The New Aurangabad city (after completion of the project) has been handed over to the Aurangabad Municipal Corporation. For the rapid industrialization of the city a new industrial area was planned skirting the township at Chikalthana village namely Chikalthana Maharashtra Industrial Development Corporation (MIDC).

=== Town center ===
The main commercial district of the city is known as Town Center Connaught, and houses the offices of major banks and public sector companies. It also houses several offices of central and state governments. The surrounding area has existing and upcoming shopping malls & multiplexes such as Fame Adlabs, PVR Cinemas& Satyam Cinemas.

From the tourism point of view several hospitality majors are based in Cidco. Companies like the ITC Welcome group. , The Ambassador Ajanta. & the Tata group Taj Residency. have their five-star properties here. In the field of education trusts such as Jawaharlal Nehru Engineering College and the Maulana Azad Education Trust have set up vast campuses offering courses in diverse fields such as Engineering and Medicine.

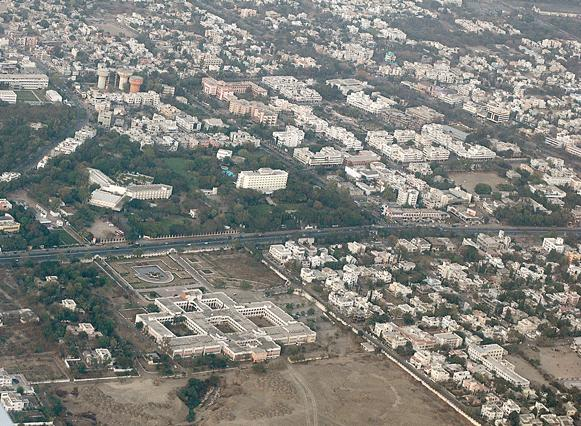
Bombay High Court Aurangabad Bench, ITC Welcomgroup's The Rama International, Ajanta Ambassador & Cidco Town Center - Aerial view

New Aurangabad, CIDCO.
Appointment of CIDCO as S.P.A.	30.12.1972,
Total Notified Area (Ha.)	1011.90
Area developed till date	999.50
Area yet to be developed (Ha.)	12.30

== Waluj Aurangabad ==
A new industrial cum residential township has been planned at Waluj in Aurangabad by CIDCO. It is 12 km southwest of Aurangabad city and is well connected by road to the city. The new town is named Waluj Mahanagar.

=== New town ===
This project is approximately eight times the size of those executed in Aurangabad city. CIDCO has conceived Waluj as a ring township, with the ring route acting as a spine for urban activities around the industrial center (MIDC), with independent and inter-linked nagars spread all around the core with their strong links between workplaces and residences. The ring routes also facilitate an easy and economical transportation system to operate within the new city.

The development of Waluj is encouraged through the development of core units, boosting the socio-economic development of the urban fabric. The township, when fully developed, will cover an area of around 100 km^{2}.

Waluj Mahanagar, Aurangabad.
Appointment of CIDCO as S.P.A.	07.10.91
Total Notified Area (Ha.)	8,670.00
Area in Phase I (Ha.)	1714.85
Area developed till date	160.00
Area yet to be developed (Ha.)	1554.00

== Aurangabad fringe area ==
Aurangabad Municipal Corporation area is fast developing into a major educational, commercial and industrial centre of the Marathwada Region and it is estimated to have a population of about 17 lakhs today. Considering the rate of urbanization in the fringe areas of this city, the Govt. of Maharashtra appointed CIDCO as the Special Planning Authority for Aurangabad fringe area on 03.10.2006 under section 40(1)(b) of the M.R&T.P. Act 1966 vide its notification No.TPS/3006/381/CR- 246/2006/UD-30.

=== Area and land use ===
It covers an area of approx 16,397 ha., spread over 28 villages located beyond the Aurangabad Municipal Corporation limits. As per the Regional Plan of Aurangabad, the land use plan of the fringe area proposes about 8918 Ha. (54%) for Greens, 3517 Ha (21%) for residential, 3176 ha (19%) for Forests, 113 Ha. for industrial and the rest for other zones. All necessary statistical details to know the socio-economic profile of the area, village maps, details of NA permissions etc. are being collected to build up the data base. Analysis of the topology of development across various pockets of the fringe area is underway.

Local representatives with the apprehension that CIDCO will acquire 100% land for the project made representation to State Govt. which had given time being stay for any work on the project. Subsequently, the stay has been vacated in July 2008 and CIDCO is on its way to preparing a Development Plan for the Fringe Area with minimum acquisition of land for infrastructure and social facilities.

== See also ==
- Aurangabad Industrial City
- Neighborhoods of Aurangabad
- Salim Ali Lake
- Himayat Bagh
