= Gyaneshwar =

Gyaneshwar, Gnaneshwar or Jnaneshwar (and other variants) may refer to:

- Dnyaneshwar, a 13th-century Indian Hindu saint, poet and philosopher
  - Jnaneshwar Udyan or Dnyaneshwar Udyan, a garden in Paithan, Maharashtra, India
  - Sant Dnyaneshwar (film), a 1940 Indian Marathi-language film about the saint
- Jnaneshwar Das, an Indian musician, part of the prog rock group Phenom
- Gyaneswar Patil, Indian politician
- Gyaneshwar Prasad Thapliyal (1938–2007), Indian cricketer
- Gnaneswara Rao (cricketer) (born 1984), Indian cricketer
- Kasani Gnaneshwar Mudiraj, Indian politician
- Gyaneshwar, Kathmandu, a neighborhood in Kathmandu, Bagmati Province, Nepal

== See also ==
- Dnyaneshwar (given name), an Indian masculine given name
- Gyaneshwari Yadav (born 2003), Indian weightlifter
- Jnaneswari Express, an Indian passenger train
  - Jnaneswari Express train derailment, a 2010 train accident in India
- Dnyaneshwari, a Marathi-language commentary on the Bhagavad Gita written by Dnyaneshwar
