= Maulana Azad College of Arts and Science =

College in Aurangabad, Maharashtra, India

Coordinates: 19.906683°N 75.344271°E

- مولانا آزاد کالج آف آرٹس اینڈ سائنس मौलाना आझाद कला आणि विज्ञान महाविद्यालय
- Other name: MAC Aurangabad
- Established: 1963
- Founder: Rafiq Zakaria
- Affiliations: Dr. Babasaheb Ambedkar Marathwada University
- Principal: Dr. Mazahar Farooqui
- Students: 10,000+
- Location: Dr. Rafiq Zakaria Campus, Doctor Rafiq Zakaria Marg, Rauza Bagh Rd, 431001, Aurangabad, Maharashtra, India
- Website: maca.ac.in azadcollege.in

Maulana Azad College of Arts and Science was founded in 1963 by Rafiq Zakaria; who formed a trust called Maulana Azad Education Society to manage the affairs. The college building is the Naukhanda palace; a royal palace of the Nizams, once occupied by Nizam Ali Khan, Asaf Jah II.

== History ==
In the 17th century Peer Ismail Shah a Sufi and tutor of the Mughal prince Aurangazeb laid the foundation stone of a Madarassa at Rauza Bagh Aurangabad where children of noble lineage were to be taught Arabic and Persian. The Madarassa, which later became the mausoleum of its founder fell into the hands of British and was ruined. The mansion, which is a fine blend of Mughal style architecture interlaid with Pathan features, was deteriorating. It caught the eye of Rafiq Zakaria the scholar-politician, who was making rounds of the Aurangabad constituency during the 1962 Assembly Elections. He set about the task of restoring the Madrassa.

Moved by the extreme poverty and backwardness of the people of the region, Zakaria created the Maulana Azad Education Society's campus at Rauza Bagh.

== Dr. Rafiq Zakaria Campus ==
Zakaria started with Maulana Azad College of Arts and Science in 1963 with 144 students. The faculty of Commerce was added and later on, Geology, Industrial Chemistry, Instrumentation Practice, Electronics and Microbiology course were introduced. At the Junior college level vacation courses at the +2 level were introduced.

=== Marathwada College of Education ===
Not one of the seven districts of the Marathwada region had a single college with using the Urdu language. Therefore, Zakaria started Marathwada College of education in 1970 with 70 seats earmarked for Urdu and the remaining 50 for other languages, particularly Marathi, state language.

The college has a strength of 230; it is one of the biggest colleges of education in Marathwada and has the distinction of obtaining the highest number of merit students in the university examinations.

=== Y.B. Chavan College of Pharmacy ===
College and university rankings

Pharmacy – India
- NIRF (2024): 76

There was no training in pharmacy in the jurisdiction of Dr. Babasaheb Ambedkar Marathwada University Zakaria started the Kamla Nehru Polytechnic (Pharmacy) in 1974 with a capacity of 60 students. From the academic year (1989–90) the Trust was given permission to start the B.Pharm. College which is recognized by the All India Council for Technical Education, and the Directorate of Technical Education of Maharashtra. The intake capacity is 60 every year. This college has been named after the veteran national leader and the first Chief Minister of Maharashtra Mr. Y B Chavan who was a patron and well wisher of the Maulana Azad Educational Trust.

In 1985 a hospital was started to provide training to the pharmacy students, and to cater to the needs of the local people living in the vicinity. The trust has persuaded pharmaceutical company Wockhardt Ltd. to enter into collaboration with it to manage the Y.B. Chavan College of Pharmacy and provided students with their expertise and practical training in their factory and research center in Aurangabad.

Y.B. Chavan College of Pharmacy was ranked 76th in India by the National Institutional Ranking Framework (NIRF) pharmacy ranking in 2024.

=== Hinduja Technological Center ===
To provide jobs for school dropouts, the trust has started the Hinduja Technological Center, which specializes in two ITI courses Draughtsman (Civil and Electronics) and runs the institute as full-fledged Industrial Training Institute. More courses are being added such as electronics, Civil engineering and Carpentry.

=== Institute of Hotel Management, Aurangabad ===
The Institute of Hotel Management runs in collaboration with the Taj Group of Hotels. For every IHM seat, there are over twenty applicants from all over India. The institute was started in 1989 with a donation from the House of Tatas. The institute is residential, and affiliated to the Huddersfield University of the United Kingdom, which grants its degree of B.A. in Hotel Management to the successful students of the institute.

It has arrangement with Wider University in the United States which permits the diploma holder of IIHM to enroll with a transfer of credits to their degree course in USA. The American Hotel and Motel Association that runs an educational institute in the campus of Michigan State University has after evaluating that IIHM programmes and facilities, agreed to offer their diploma to IIHM students. On the successful completion of this Diploma course a person gains the highest Administrator (CHA) diploma, which means the person is certified as a member of the industrial elite in hospitality worldwide.

=== Horniman College of Journalism ===
One of the latest additions to the Maulana Azad Educational Campus is the College of Journalism and Mass Communications; it has been started to give training in the field of mass media; such as newspapers and journals, television, and radio. Journalists and authors and television personalities have agreed to be visiting or guest professor.

=== The Tom Patrick Institute of Computer and IT ===
The institute was set up by Maulana Azad Educational Trust in 1999. Tom Patrick is the Senior. Executive Vice President of Merrill Lynch whose association with the college may assist Indo-America collaboration in this field. The institute offers Master of Computer Application (M.C.A.), a 3-year master's degree Course, with accreditation from AICTE, New Delhi and affiliation of Dr. Babasaheb Ambedkar Marathwada University, Aurangabad.

=== Aurangabad College for Women ===
The college was set up in 1968 to provide higher education facilities to girls whose parents were averse to the co-educational system. A separate section for the girls was started at the Navkhanda place, a historic landmark, where the first Nizam Asaf Jah I was living. It also runs a nursery for Toddlers called the Rose Academy for Toddlers at Naukhanda palace situated near Bhadkal Gate, Aurangabad.

To meet the need of those aspiring for education in the English medium, the Model High School was started in 1980 with 80 students. The strength has now grown to over 1000.

=== Millennium Institute of Management ===
Millennium Institute of Management, is approved by the AICTE (All India Council for Technical Education), New Delhi and affiliated to Dr Babasaheb Ambedkar Marathwada University, Maharashtra, India. The Millennium Institute of Management is dedicated to the development of business professionals. The program and courses are driven with industry partnerships such as its association with TMTC (Tata Management Training Centre), Pune, which is a training facility of the TATA group.
