= Salim Ali Lake =

Lake in India

- पक्षीमित्र सलीम आली सरोवर (Marathi)
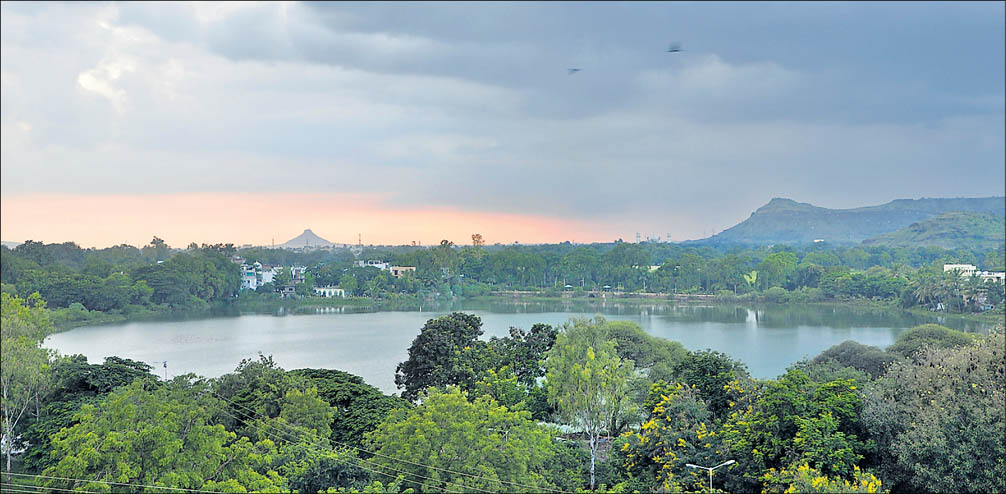
- Salim lake view

- Location within Maharashtra
- Location: Aurangabad, Maharashtra
- Coordinates: 19°53′57.26″N 75°20′32.23″E
- Etymology: Sálim Ali
- Basin countries: India
- Settlements: Aurangabad, Maharashtra

Salim Ali Lake (Marathi: पक्षीमित्र सलीम आली सरोवर) is located near Delhi Gate, one of the many Gates in Aurangabad, opposite Himayat Bagh, Aurangabad. It is located in the northern part of the city. During the Mughal period, it was known as Khiziri Talab. It has been renamed after the great ornithologist, naturalist Salim Ali and also known as birdman of India. The office of Divisional Commissioner Aurangabad division is located near it, so is the collector's office of Aurangabad District.

== Mughal era ==
In Aurangzeb's time, a large marsh or tank extended the whole length of the northern wall, (extending from present-day Salim Ali Lake till Begumpura / Makbara) but the exhalation and dampness proved unhealthy and Aurangzeb ordered the portion immediately in front of his palace (Kila-e-Ark) to be filled in and converted into fields. This reclaimed portion was later developed into Mughal garden, (now known as Himayat Bagh) by one of the officials of Aurangzeb's court, with many fruit-bearing trees of different varieties for the royal court and its officials. The remainder was known as the Khizri talao which is just beyond the Delhi gate. The other small tank was the Kanval or Loti talao, (near present-day Aam Khas grounds between Kila-e-Ark and Begumpura) was fed by a spring and was confined in the hollow between the palace of Aurangzeb and the Mecca gate, but the band was purposely destroyed to save the city from being flooded.

== Present period ==
Salim Ali Talab as it is known in the present times also contains a small bird Sanctuary and the area around the lake is good for Bird watching in Winter when a number of migratory birds arrive for nesting. There is a garden maintained by the Aurangabad Municipal Corporation. Boating facilities are also available when the lake is full during the rainy & winter seasons. Recently it was dredged for silt to increase its water holding capacity.

== Biodiversity ==
Salim Ali lake and its surrounding is rare and rich biodiversity spot within the city that hosts almost 16 tree species, 11 shrub types, 8 climbers, 32 terrestrial herbaceous plants, 10 varieties of algae, 12 of aquatic herbs, 16 aquatic insects, molluscs and crustaceans, nine varieties of fish, 15 species reptiles, seven types of rodents and mammals and 102 types of insects. Efforts are taken by environment activists and bird lovers in the city to close the historic Salim Ali Lake for public for the time being and declare it as a biodiversity hot spot for conservation.

== See also ==
- Neighborhoods of Aurangabad
- Himayat Baugh Aurangabad
- Aurangabad CIDCO
