= Naukhanda palace =

Naukhanda Palace
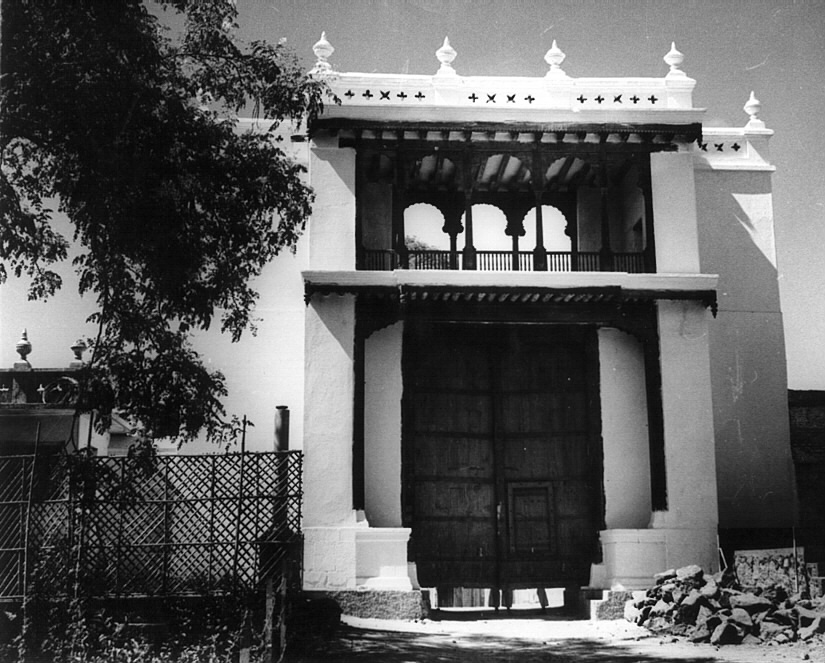
- Interactive map of the Naukhanda Palace area

General information
- Type: Royal Palace
- Location: Mill Corner, Aurangabad, Maharashtra, India
- Completed: 1616
- Owner: Azmat Jah

The Naukhanda Palace is a royal palace of the Nizams located in Aurangabad, Maharashtra, India.

== History ==
The palace was built by Malik Ambar in 1616 upon the summit of a rising ground at Aurangabad, India. The massive portal gateway leading to this, over which the Naubatkhana sounded, was called Barkal. According to one account, a noble of Aurangzeb’s court named Alam Khan made additions to this Palace; and further additions were subsequently made by Asaf Jah I. An adjoining block of buildings was screened off by a partition wall for Nasir Jang. The Naukonda palace was also occupied by Nizam Ali Khan, when he was at Aurangabad.

== Layout ==
The palace had nine apartments. The interior buildings consisted of five zenanas, the Diwan-i-Am (a public audience hall), the Diwan-i-Khas (a private audience hall), a mosque and a throne room, each provided with a garden and a cistern. The walls of the central part of the Devankhana, and a hot bath attached to the building, are in a fair state of preservation. However, the wood-work and the stucco plaster are all gone. The Diwan-i-Am is a large quadrangular structure much in ruins. The throne room contains a gadi of the Nizam. In the throne room are placed the original paraphernalia.

The Diwan-i-Am was demolished when the present medical college of Aurangabad was constructed. The palace now houses The Aurangabad College for women. In the olden days Nawab Salar Jang's palace and Govind Baksh's mahal were between the Paitan and Jafar gates.

It is presently owned by Prince Azmat Jah Bahadur.
