= Šuker =

Šuker is a Croatian surname. It can refer to:

- Davor Šuker (born 1968), retired Croatian footballer
- Ivan Šuker (born 1957), Croatian economist and politician
- Tomislav Šuker (born 1940), Croatian athlete

== See also ==
- Suker Chak, ancestral village of the confederacy of Sukerchakia Misl
