= Dnyaneshwar (given name) =

Dnyaneshwar is a masculine given name. Notable people with the name include:

- Dnyaneshwar Agashe, Indian businessman, cricketer, cricket administrator, and philanthropist
- Dnyaneshwar Katke, Indian politician
- Dnyaneshwar Mhatre, Indian politician
- Dnyaneshwar Mulay, Indian diplomat and author
- Dnyaneshwar Patil, Indian politician
