= Bhadkal Gate =

1612 memorial in Maharashtra, India

Coordinates: 19.888733°N 75.321676°E

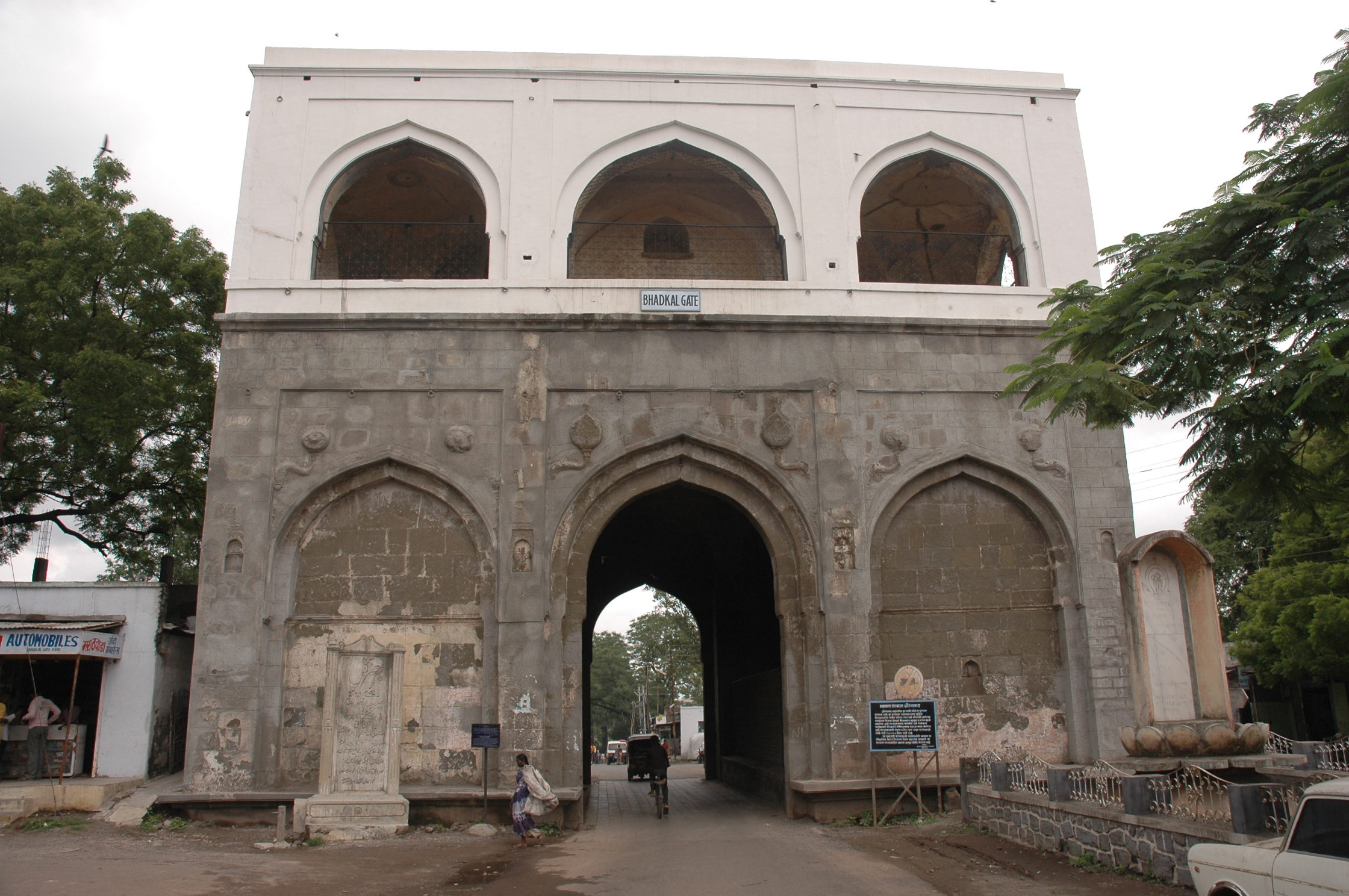

Bhadkal Gate is a structure in Aurangabad City in Maharashtra, India. This gate is the biggest in the city. It was built by Ahamadnagar's Murtaza Nizamshah's vizier Malik Ambar to commemorate the victory against the Mughals in 1612. It is also known as Victory Gate.

The monument is listed under State Protected Monuments of Maharashtra as compiled by Archaeological Survey of India.
