= Panchakki =

Water mill in Aurangabad, Maharashtra

Coordinates: 19°53′22″N 75°18′56″E

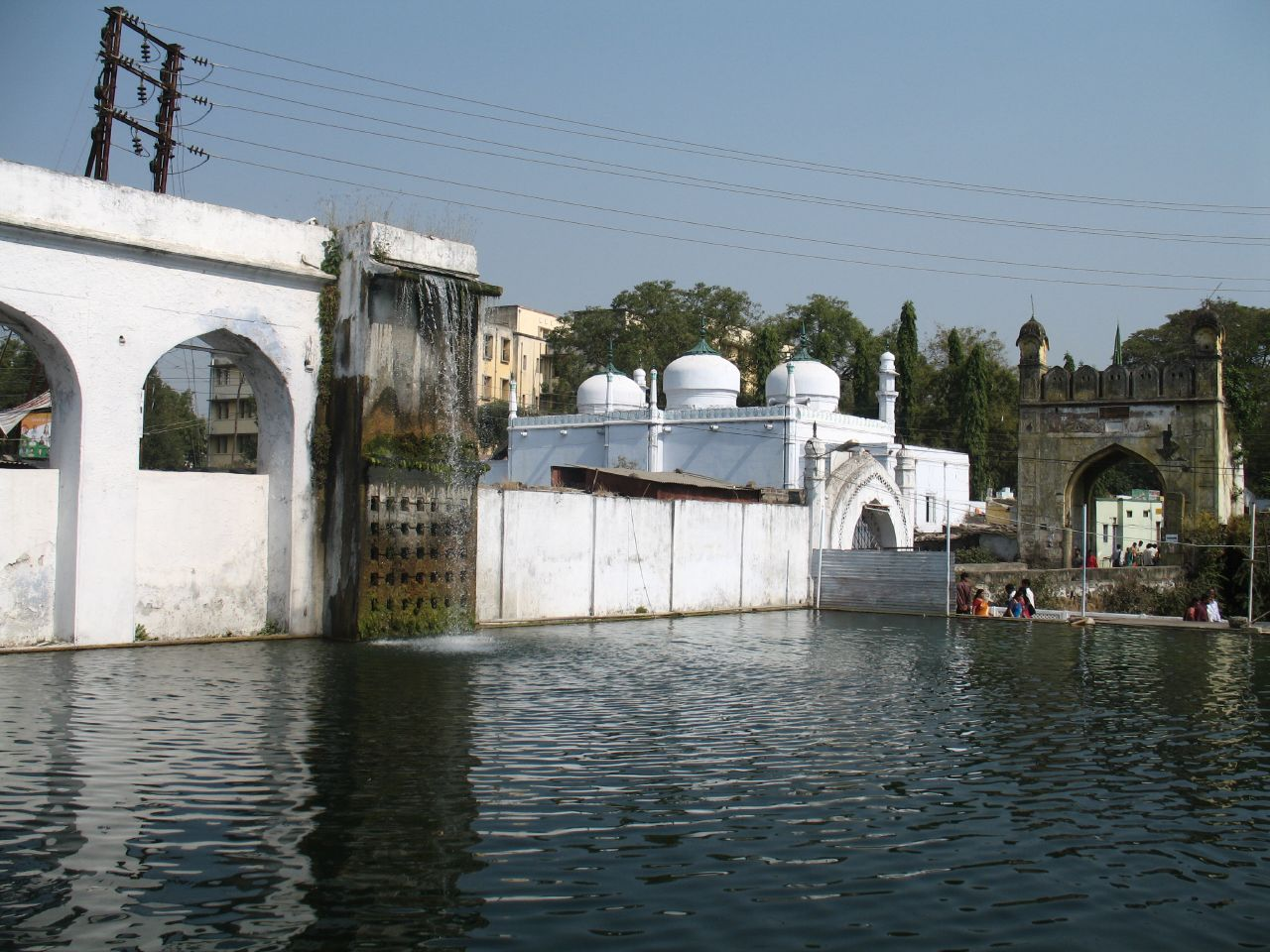
Panchakki fountain, Aurangabad.

Panchakki is a water mill located in Aurangabad, Maharashtra, and is an example of medieval Indian architecture. It was designed to generate energy using water from a mountain spring. The building, attached to the dargah of Baba Shah Musafir, a Sufi saint, is located in a garden near the Mahmud Darvaza. The complex contains a mosque, madrassa, kacheri, minister's house, sarai, and houses for zananas.

== History ==
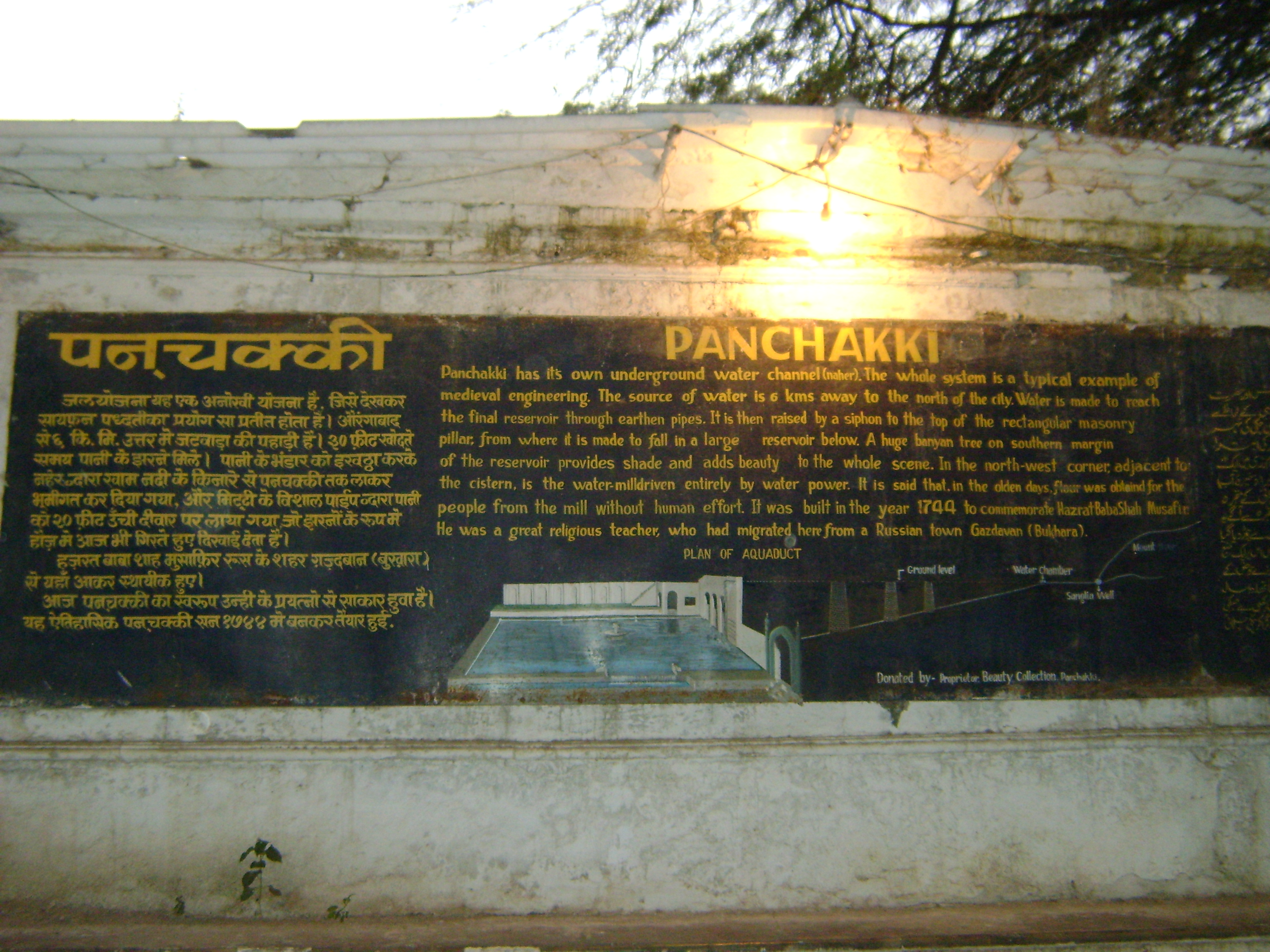
The board at the entrance of Panchakki

Most of the buildings in the dargah complex (including Panchakki) were erected by Turktaz Khan, a noble on the staff of Nizam-ul-Mulk Asaf Jah in about 1695 A. D. The oblong reservoir in front of the mosque and fountains was added 20 years later by Jamil Beg Khan. This water mill was designed to use the energy generated by flowing water from a nearby spring to turn the large grinding stones of the flour mill. Shah Musafir died in 1689. The watermill was used to grind grain for the pilgrims and disciples of saints as well as for the troops of the garrison.

== Operating process ==
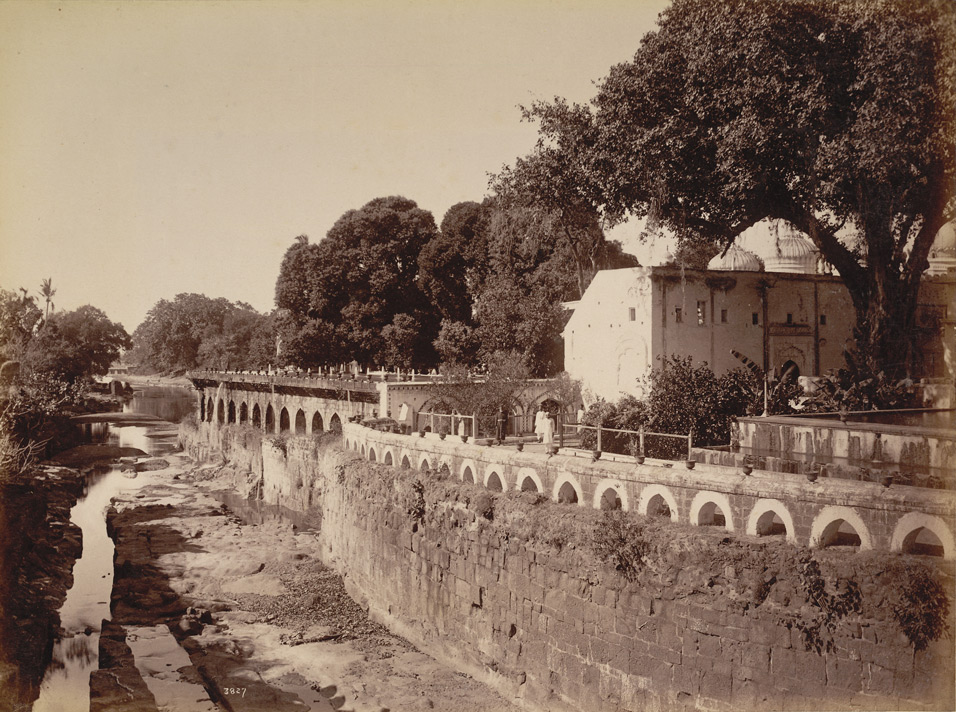
Panchakki, Baba Shah Mosafar Dargah 1880s

The water-mill supplied by an underground conduit originating from a well above the junction of the Harsul River and a tributary, roughly 8 km away. The conduit crosses the tributary near its confluence with Harsul then proceeds to the Panchakki reservoir. Water falls into the Panchakki cistern from a sufficient height to generate the necessary power to drive the mill. The cistern lies in front of the mosque, underneath which is a 164 by 31 feet (50.0 by 9.4 m) hall. Pilgrims used the hall, and it contains fountains. The excess water is released into the Kham River.

The hall overlooks the Kham River. The grounds contain a cenotaph to the spiritual preceptor of Baba Musafir Shah, a tomb to his disciple Baba Shah Mahmood, and a few other graves. A banyan tree stands on the southern side of the reservoir. In the northwest corner, adjacent to the cistern, is the water mill driven by water, formerly used to grind grain.

The Kaula Nala runs alongside the garden and is crossed by two bridges. The walls of Begampura lie to the right and the city walls to the left, with Shah Musafir's garden positioned between the latter and the river bank. The garden walls extend to the bed of the Nala. The dargah and accompanying buildings, along with the cisterns and fountains, are located among the garden vegetation.

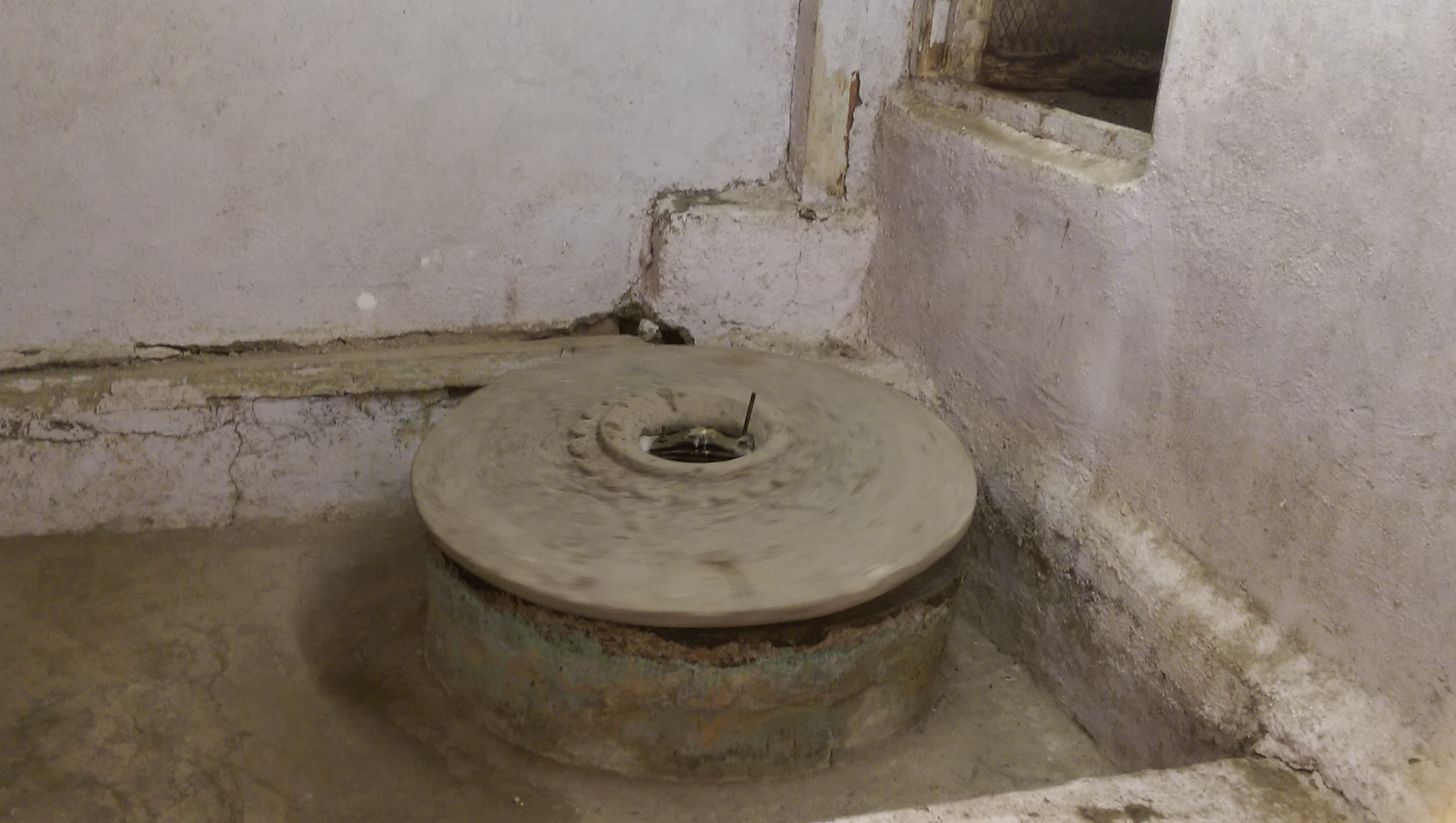
Panchakki, Aurangabad

== Recent ==
An 18th-century library, housing manuscripts and a number of precious books have been reopened after 70 years here (Aurangabad). The library treasured about 100,000 books and writing pieces until Indian independence (1947). However, it was closed down in the 1970s due to administrative reasons, due to which many of the library books were shifted to Hyderabad. The library presently houses 2,500 books on various subjects related to history, law, medicine, Sufism, religion and philosophy in Arabic, penned by philosophers, saints, and scholars in Urdu and Persian language.

Panchakki also houses the headquarters of the Waqf board of Maharashtra.

== See also ==
- Aurangabad
- Aurangabad Water System
- Ajanta Caves
