= Himayat Bagh =

Coordinates: 19°54′11.78″N 75°20′15.39″E

Himayat Bagh Biodiversity Heritage site is a 17th-century garden that now houses the Fruit Research Station and Nursery, which is a part of the Vasantrao Naik Marathwada Krishi Vidyapeeth. It is located near Delhi Gate in Rauza Bagh area of Aurangabad, in the Indian state of Maharashtra. It is a sprawling complex spread over 300 acres (1.2 km^{2}), naturally green and in the olden days it was known as the Mughal Garden.

== Mughal era ==
In Aurangzeb's time, Khizri Talao extended the whole length of the northern wall, (extending from present day Salim Ali Lake till Begumpura / Makbara) but the exhalation and dampness proved unhealthy and Aurangzeb ordered the portion immediately in front of his palace (Kila-e-Ark) to be filled in and converted into fields. This reclaimed portion was later developed into Mughal garden, (now known as Himayat Bagh) by one of the officials of Aurangzeb's court, with many fruit-bearing trees of different varieties for the royal court and its officials.

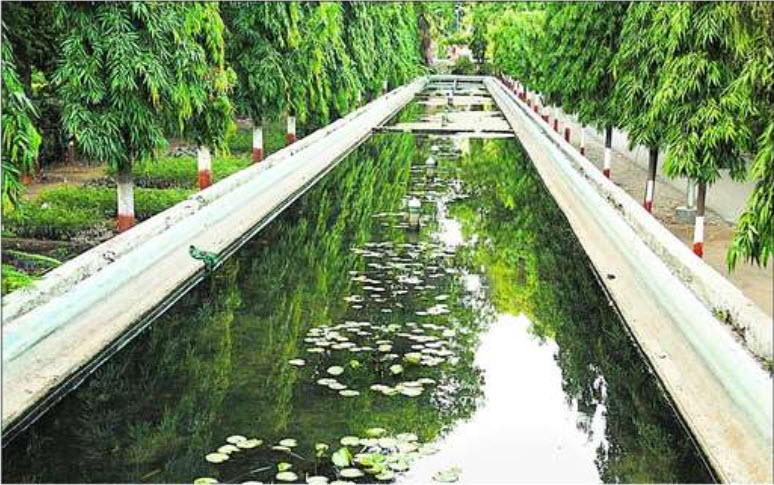
Himayat Bagh Aurangabad

=== Barra Darri ===
Himayat Bagh also houses the Barra Darri which was erected by Ivaz Khan. A covered aqueduct passes over one of the buildings and in the olden day's water descended in a shower into an oblong cistern below containing several fountains. A marvelous feat of engineering that involved an underground water chamber; it created a natural air-conditioning that cooled the entire area when in operation. It is now inoperative, but the system still exists and is worth a study. Barra Darri now houses the office of Fruit Research Station.

== Present period ==
The Himayat Bagh is a tourist attraction in itself because of its greenery and cool environment. Visitors can have a look at various plants and trees in the nursery, on which research is being conducted.

Visitors are able to buy plants that are grafted by experienced local malis (gardeners) in the gardens. There are saplings from tamarind to mango, and one can see the saplings and then see how the tree looks when it is fully grown. The underground drainage pipeline work being carried out by the municipal corporation has damaged the northern historical wall of this beautiful place. After cognisance taken by Sakal newspaper, the summer palace was emptied by VNK university. This palace is rare and is half underground. The water flowing on all sides of this octagonal palace keeps it at least 5 degrees cooler than the outer temperature. Earlier it was filled with scrap.

== See also ==
- Salim Ali Lake
- Neher water system
