= Jnaneshwar Udyan =

Coordinates: 19.486735°N 75.382047°E

Jnaneshwar Udyan or Dnyaneshwar Udyan is a garden in Maharashtra resembling the Brindavan Gardens near Mysore. It was built in the 1970s by the state government, adjacent to Nathsagar, the reservoir formed by the Jayakwadi Dam. It is located in the ancient town of Paithan which is 40 km south of Aurangabad. Out of an area of 125 hectares, orchids cover 26 hectares and 28 hectares are laid out as parks. Colourful flowerbeds, vast lawns and musical fountains are the attractions of the udyan. Ten plazas and twenty-two fountains are added features. More than a hundred thousand trees, in addition to the forty thousand fruit trees are the pride of the garden. There is a nursery selling saplings and spices. It has a children's play area, swimming pool and boat rides.

It is named after the saint Jnaneshwar, whose native village was near Paithan.

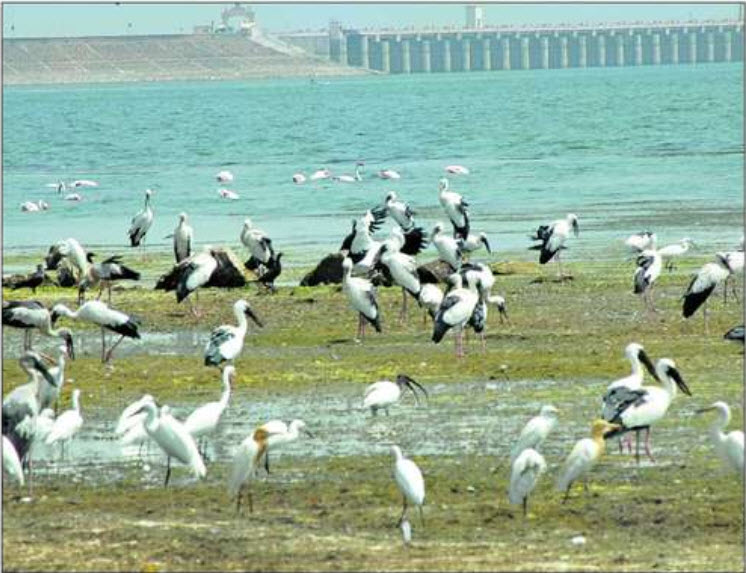
Migratory birds at Jayakwadi Dam, Aurangabad

The lake of Nathsagar spread over 350 km^{2} is a sanctuary for migratory flamingoes and other birds. Male Masjid (or Mosque) is near the garden, where the wedding ceremony between Emperor Akbar's son, Danial, and the princess of Bijapur, took place.
