= Gates in Aurangabad =

Coordinates: 19°53′19.63″N 75°20′36.37″E

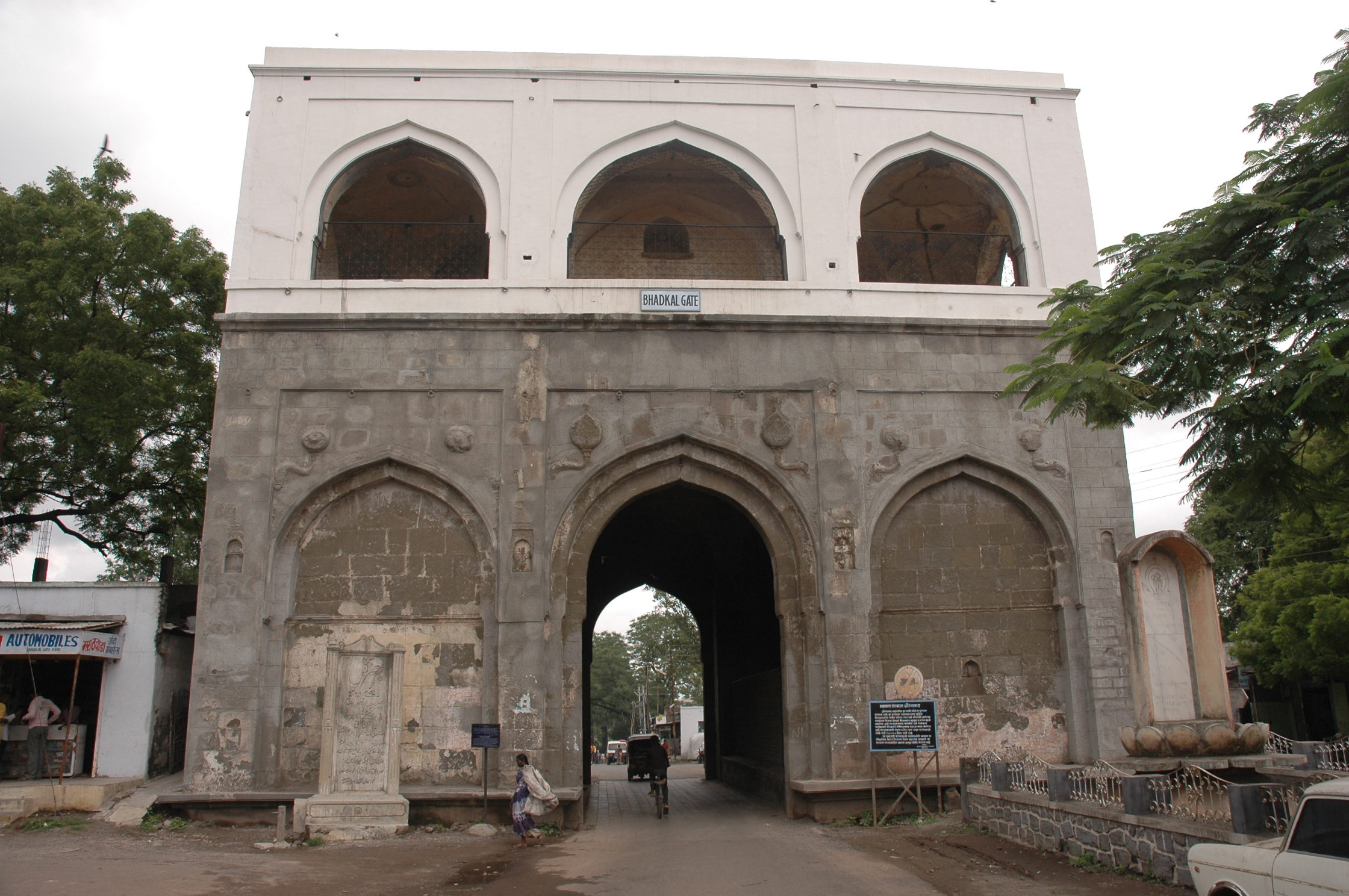
Bhadkal Gate, Aurangabad

The Gates of Aurangabad distinguish it from several other medieval cities in India. Each of the 52 gates have a local history or had individuals linked with it.

Out of the 52, only four main and nine subordinate gates have survived, the most famous, oldest and biggest of them being the Bhadkal Gate near the Naukhanda Palace of Nizams.

== List of gates ==
Gates of Aurangabad, Maharashtra

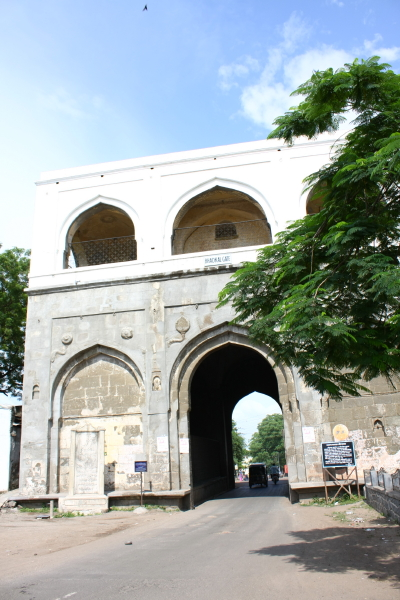
Bhadkal Gate

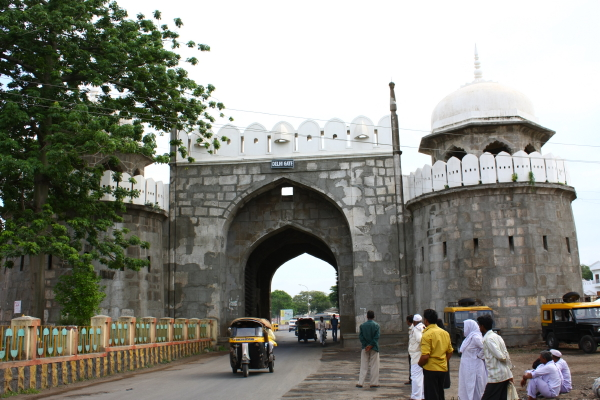
Delhi Gate

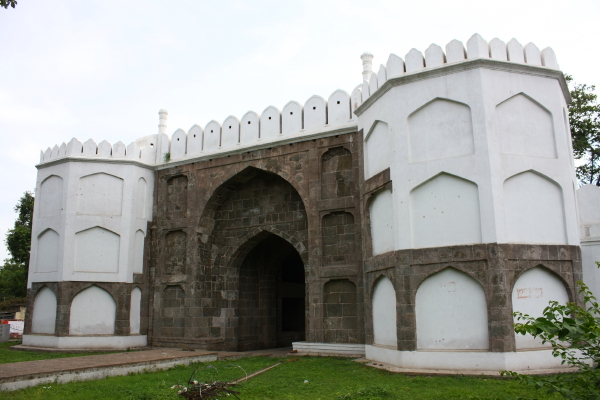
Rangeen Gate

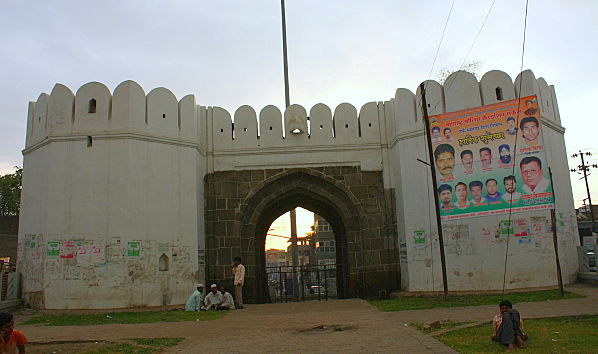
Roshan Gate

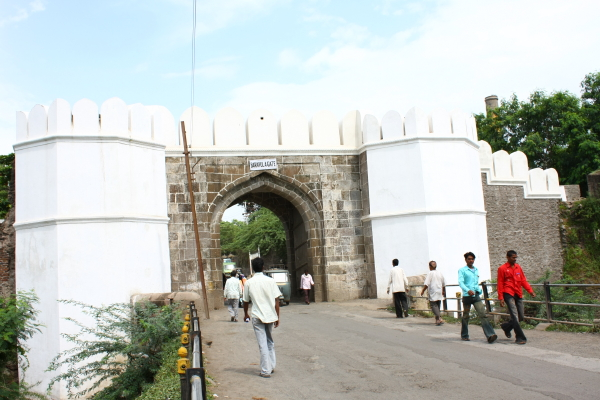
Barapulla Gate

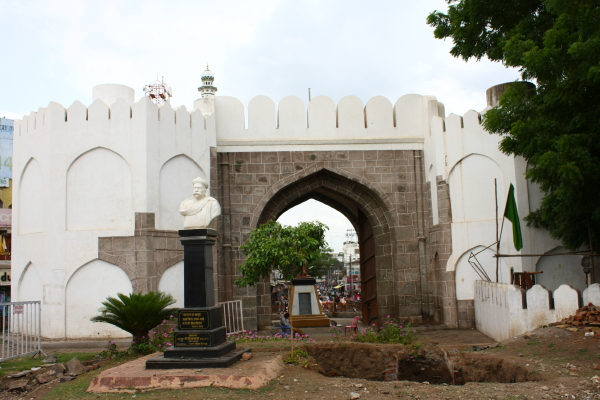
Paithan Gate

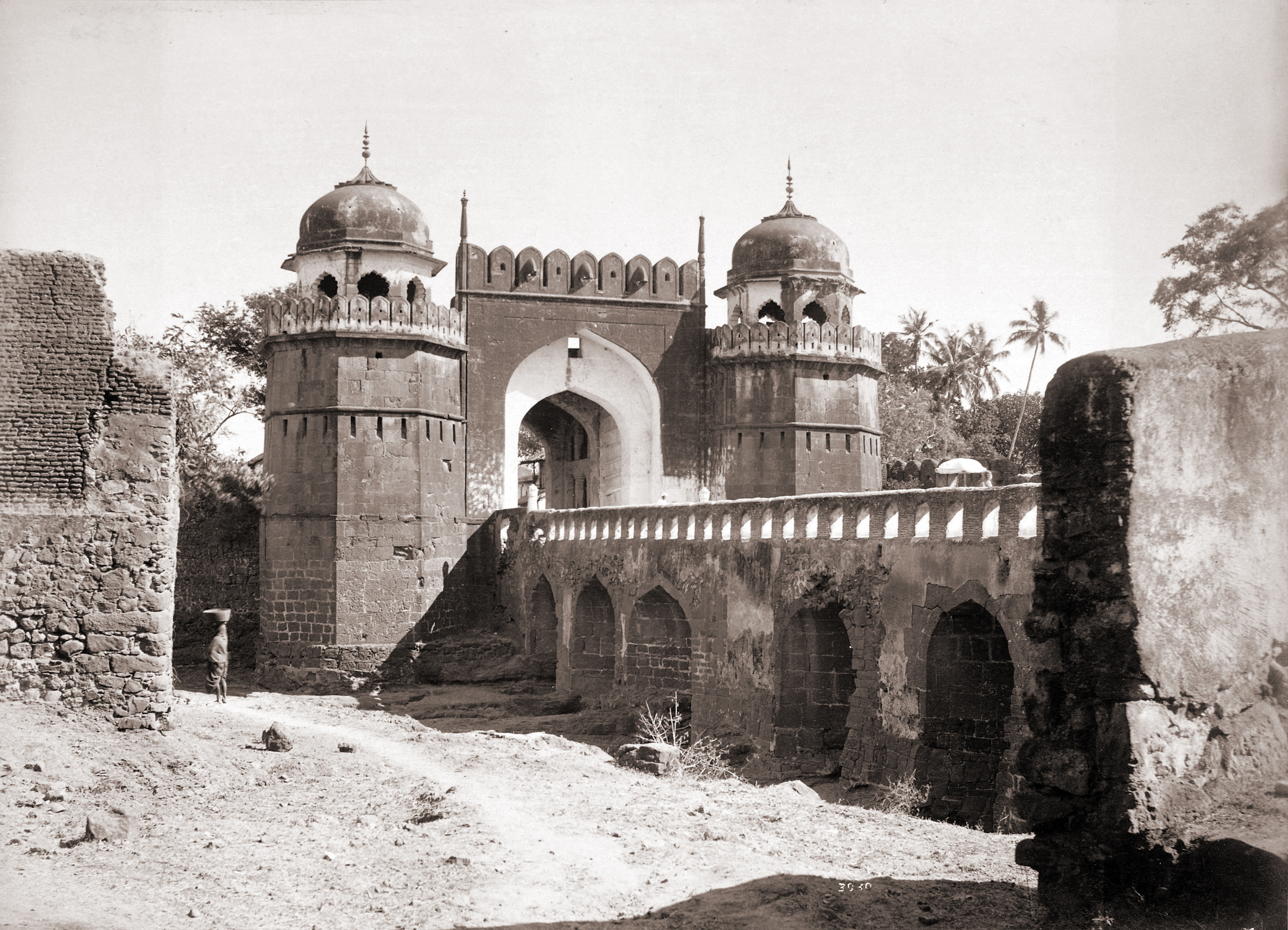
Mecca Gate

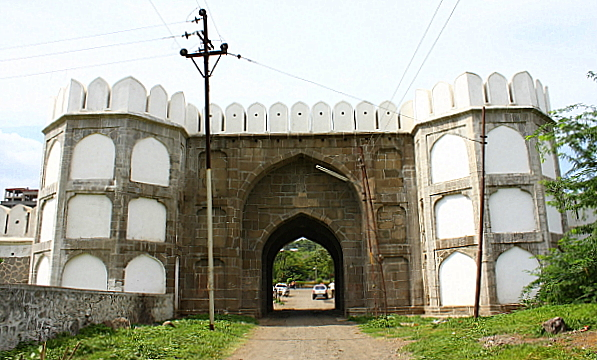
Kaala Gate

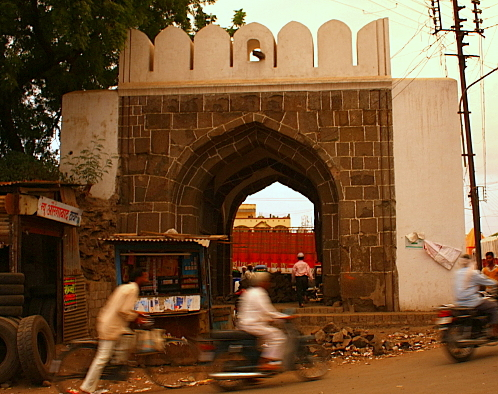
Jaffar Gate

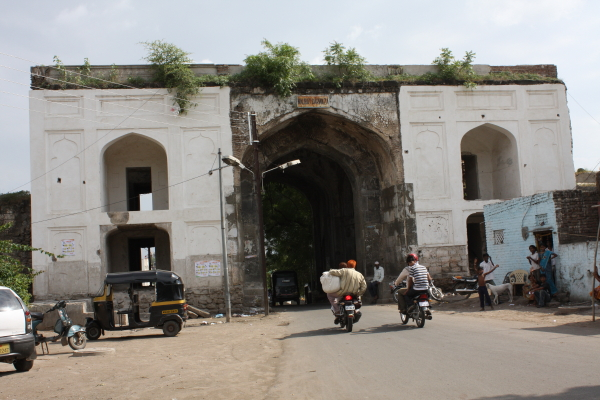
Naubat Gate

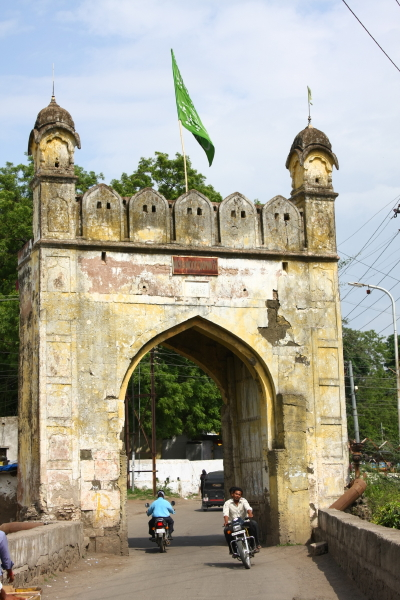
Mahmud Gate

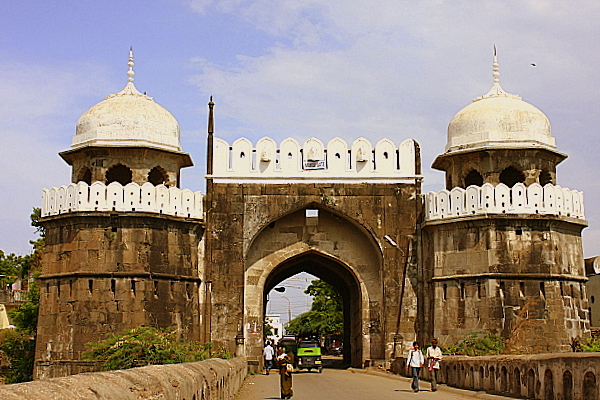
Makai Gate

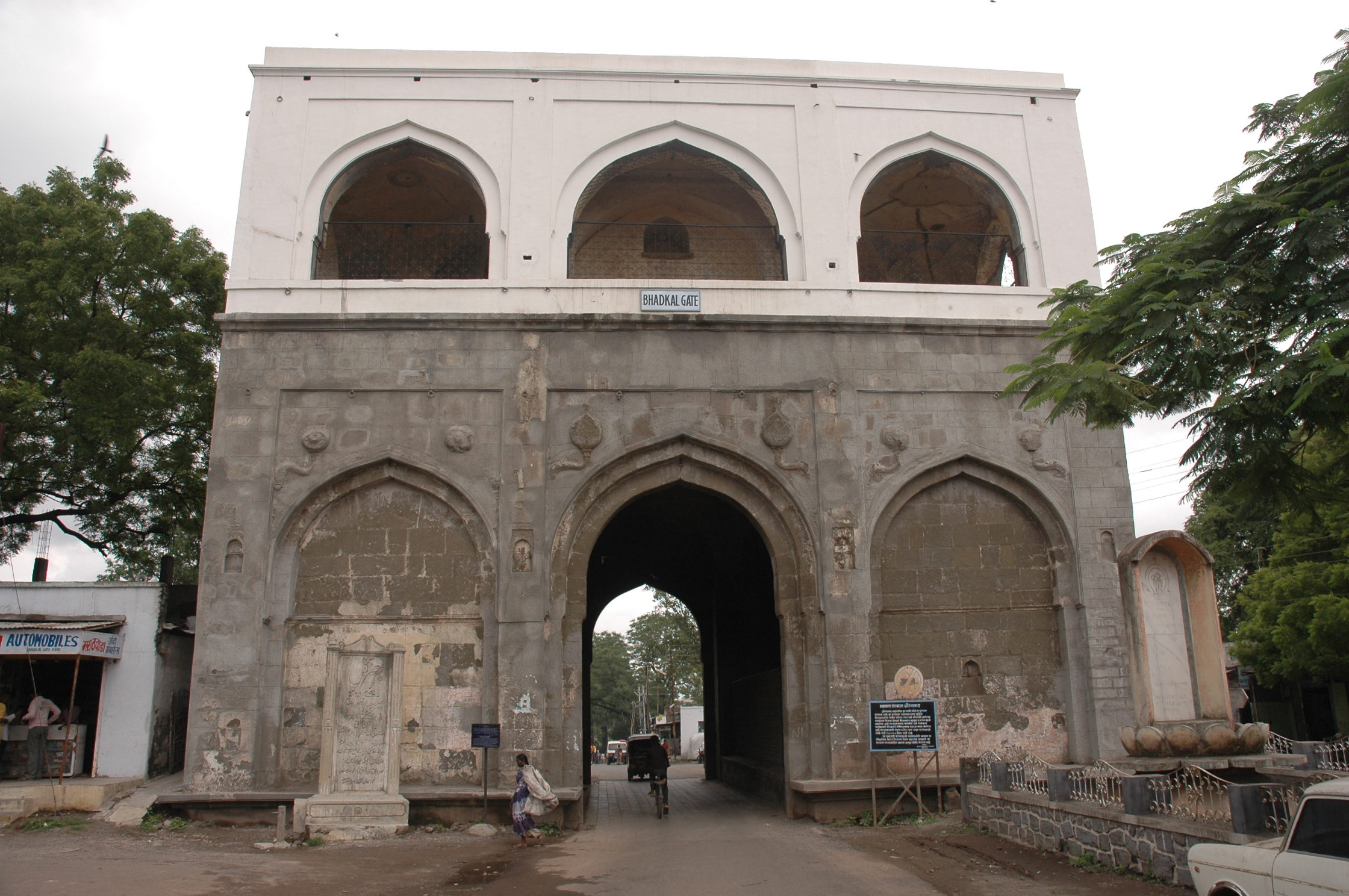
Bhadkal Gate
1. Delhi Gate
2. Rangeen Darwaza
3. Islam Darwaza (kat-Kat Gate)
4. Roshan Gate or (Jalna Gate)
5. Barapulla Gate
6. Paithan Gate
7. Khaas Gate
8. Jaffar Gate
9. Quil-e-Ark (Naubat Darwaza)
10. Kaala Gate
11. Mahmud Gate
12. Begum Darwaza
13. Makai Gate (Mecca Gate)
14. Bhadkal Gate
15. Chhota Bhadkal Gate
16. Khizar darwaza or (Haathi Gate) or (Majnu Gate)
17. Khooni darwaza
18. Mir Adil Gate

== History ==
Aurangabad city walls

When Aurangzeb made Aurangabad his capital, there were 54 suburbs which were walled in the city itself, the chief of these were Begumpura and Aurangpura.

During Khan Jahan's second viceroyalty, Aurangzeb built a wall around the city in 1682, to protect it from the incursions of the Marathas; and in 1696 he erected a similar fortified wall for Begumpura. The city wall is terraced, and is of solid masonry, but of no great height, being in many parts not more than fourteen feet. The battlements are loop-holed, and the merlins over the gateways and at certain places along the wall, are machicolated; while semi-circular bastions surmounted by towers, occur at each flanking angle, and at regular intervals along the works. The wall is pierced with thirteen gateways, exclusive of a small postern wicket, and its total length is a little over six miles. All gates barring one are associated with Aurangzeb.

The four principal entrances face the cardinal points, and consist of the Delhi gate in the north, the Jalna gate in the east, the Paithan gate in the south, and the Mecca gate in the west.

Besides these, there are the Jaffar, Khirki, Barapul, Mahmud and Roshan gates; as well as four others, now closed, the Khizri, Khadgar, Mada, and Kumhar. The Barapul had also been walled up for some time.

=== Bhadkal Gate ===
Bhadkal Gate is the biggest gate of city. It was built by Ahmadnagar's, Murtaza Nizamshah's Vazir Malik Ambar. It was built to commemorate the victory against the Mughal Empire in 1612 and is therefore also known as the victory gate. Bhadkal Gate is architecturally unique as India's first column structured building.

=== Delhi Gate ===
The largest and the most stately gate, it was built by Aurangzeb. It is situated to the north of the city facing Delhi. It is similar to the Lahore Gate of Delhi’s Lal Quila (Red Fort).

=== Paithan Gate ===
The gate is smaller in size and was royal gateway leading to Paithan town. This gate is smaller in size compared to other gates.

=== Mecca or Makai Gate ===
This gate leads to Begumpura another walled quarter of the city, and is the only gate that has a canon installed on it. It faces the holy city of Mecca towards the west.

=== Khas or Jalna Gate ===
The gate is simple in design but was disintegrating. It has been restored recently. It faces the Jalna city in the east.

=== Kaala Darwaza ===
This gate leads to the palace fort of Qila-e-Ark. The palace had its own fortification walls and had five gates other than the Kaala darwaza all gates are in ruins.

=== Roshan Gate ===
This gate is located to the north of Jalna gate or Khas gate. It is bigger in size and stature as compared to Jalna gate. Roshan gate is said to have been named after Aurangezeb’s sister Roshanara to whom the emperor was much attached and she remained his favorite friend and advisor.

== See also ==
- Tourism in Marathwada
- Aurangabad Water System
