= Neighborhoods of Aurangabad =

Coordinates: 19°53′17.89″N 75°19′48.35″E

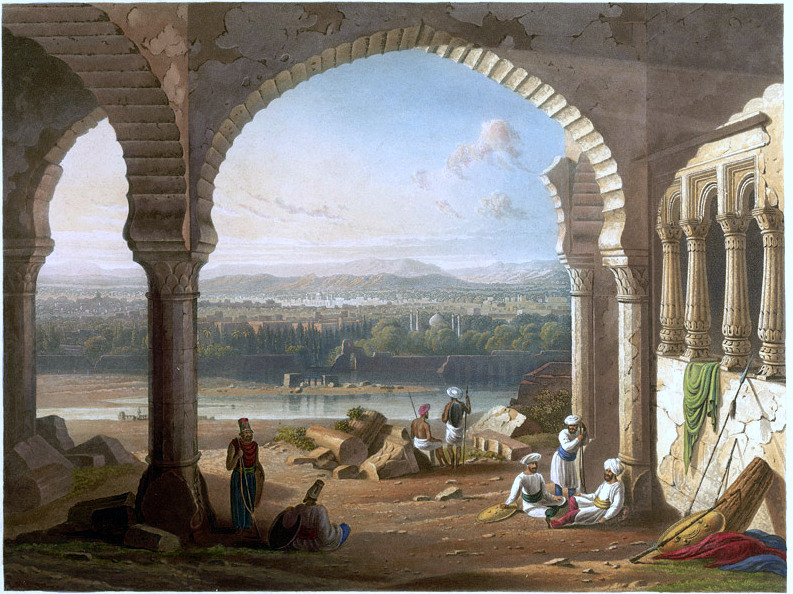
View of Begumpura from Aurangzeb's palace 1830s

When Aurangzeb made Aurangabad his capital, there were 54 suburbs which were walled in like the city itself, but the chief of these that were populated in the 19th century were Begampura and Aurang-pura.

== Old suburbs ==
The names of the suburbs are/were

*Begampura
- Aurangpura
- Mukampura
- Fazalpura
- Ahirpura
- Dawadpura
- Nawabpura
- Bajipura
- Darveshpura
- Nakashpura
- Kutubpura
- Jasuspura
- Sultanpura
- Karanpura
- Chelipura
- Subkaranpura
- Ismailpura
- Tanjipura
- Padampura
- Lasgopalpura
- Manjurpura
- Haisingpura
- Partabpura
- Pahadsingpura
- Jamalpura
- Mansingpura
- Jaisingpura
- Jaswantsingpura
- Bhausingpura
- Jaychandpura
- Ranmastpura
- Paidapura
- Hamilpura
- Dhori-pura
- Kalhalpura
- Paraspura
- Tabibpura
- Ramraspura
- Chakarpura
- Kotwalpura
- Lalwantpura
- Asadpura
- Rampura
- Rengtipnra
- Kesarsingpura
- Balochpura
- Rambapura
- Khokarpura
- Maujipura
- Jasudpura

Out of the above, Pahadsingpura, Kutubpura, Jaisingpura, Balochpura, Karnapura, Padampura, and Jaswant-singpura were founded by the rajas who accompanied Aurangzib; Subkaranpura and Pahadsingpura belonged to the raja of Bandalkand; Pudampura and Karanpura belonged to the raja of Bikanir, and Jaisingpura to the raja of Jaipur. A large market for vegetables is held daily at Maujipura which is now almost in ruins, while Bhausingpura is under cultivation.

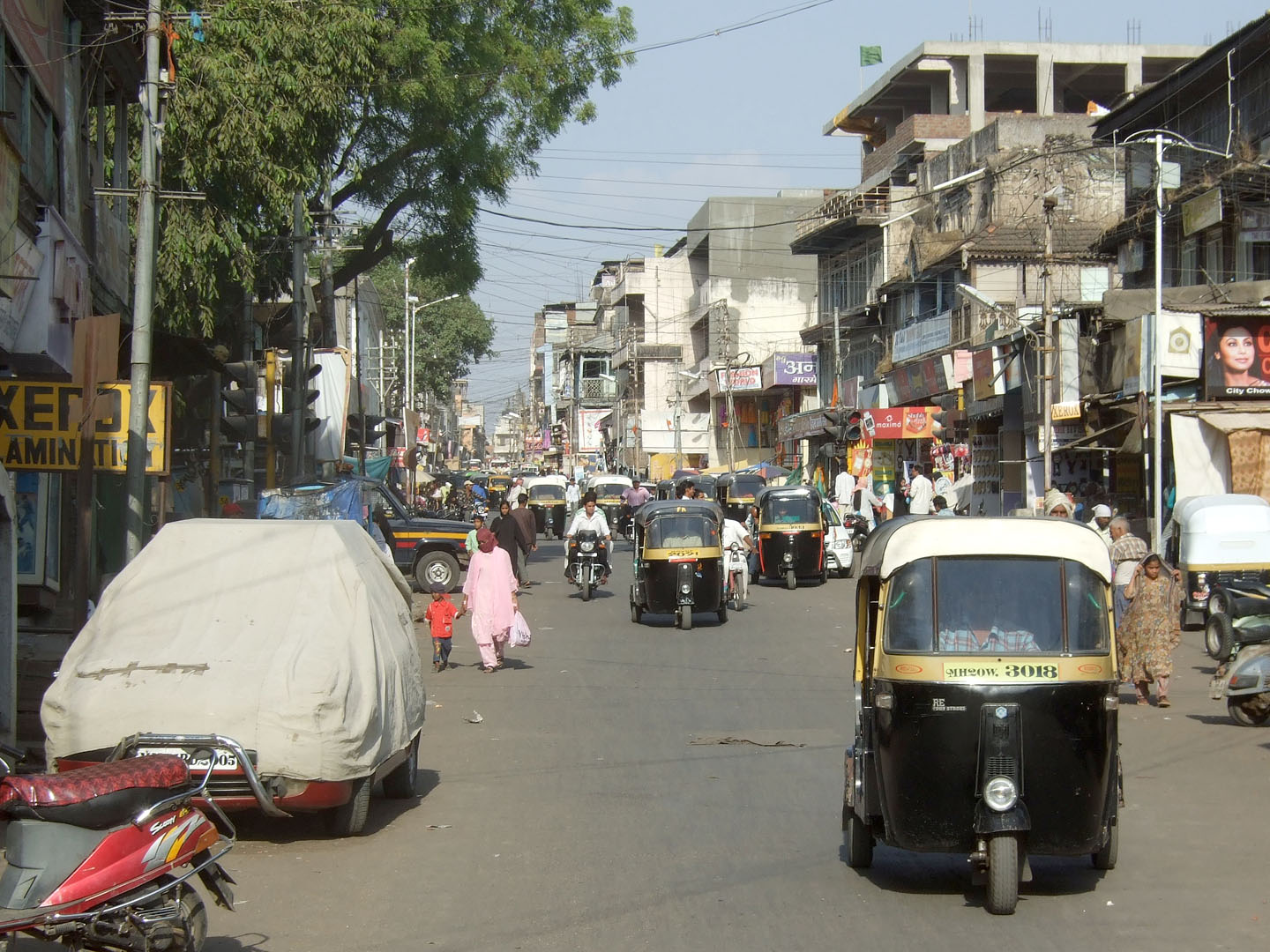
Juna-Bazar Aurangabad

== Old bazaars ==
There were 38 bazaars, named after the principal articles sold in them, and held in the streets leading to the several gateways. The chief bazaars were Rang Mahal, Azamnagar, Dalai Bari, Taksal, Ram Ganj, Fakirwari, Shah Ganj, Khadim Bazaar, Chauk Baldar, Shah Bazaar, Urdu Bazaar, Raja Rambaksh Bazaar, Guru Ganj, Zuna Bazaar, Gul Mandi, Dal Mandi, Shakar Mandi, and Chawal Mandi.

== New neighborhoods of Aurangabad City ==
* Aarif Colony
- Aasifiya Colony
- Aurangpura
- Altamash Colony
- Angoori Bagh
- Bada Takiya
- Baiji Pura
- Balaji Nagar
- Bajrang Chowk
- Bajaj Nagar & Waluj
- Bahrat Nagar
- Bansilal Nagar
- Begum Pura
- Bhadkal Gate
- Buddi Lane
- Bukkal Guda
- CIDCO(N-1 to N-15)
- Central Naka
- Cheli Pura
- Chetana Nagar
- Chota Takiya
- City Chowk
- Champa Chowk
- Chawani
- Delhi Gate
- Dr. Rafiq Zakaria Road
- Devanagari Shahnoorwadi
- Dashmeshnagar
- Divandevdi
- Gandhinagar
- Ganesh Colony
- Garkheda
- Gulmandi
- Gulmohar Colony CIDCO N-5
- Harsul
- Hazrat Nizamuddin Road
- Heena Nagar
- Hilaal Colony
- Himayat Baugh
- HUDCO (H-1 to H-20)
- Indira Nagar, Garkheda
- Itkheda
- Jaffer Gate
- Jai Vishwabharti Colony
- Jaisinghpura
- Jalan Nagar
- Jaynagar
- Jalna Road
- Jawahar Colony
- Jinsi
- Juna Bazar
- Jubilee Park
- Jyotinagar
- Kabaadipura
- Kanchanwadi
- Kareem Colony
- Karnapura
- KatKat Gate
- Khadkeshwar
- Khara Kuwa
- Khokadpura
- Kiradpura
- Kotla Colony
- Kranti Chowk
- Kuwarfalli
- Lota Karanja
- Mahmoodpura
- Manzoorpura/Mominpura
- Mayurban Colony
- Maqsood Colony
- Mondha
- Motiwala Nagar
- Moti Karanja
- Mujeeb Colony
- Mukundwadi
- Nava Bhaata (Osmanpura)
- Nageshwarwadi
- NakshatraWadi
- Nandanvan Colony
- Narali Bag
- National Colony
- Nawabpura
- New Shreynager
- New Osmanpura
- Nirala Bazaar
- Nishaan
- Noor Colony
- Osmanpura
- Peer Bazar
- Padampura
- Padegaon
- Pandariba
- Paithan Gate
- Paithan Road
- Paithan Road Near Nathvally School
- Paithan Road Near Nath Seeds
- Pandharpur & Chitegaon MIDC
- Panalal Nagar
- Qiasar Colony
- Raja Bazar
- Rasheedpura
- Rauf Colony
- Rauza Bag
- Ravivar Bazar
- Renukamata Mandir
- Roshan Gate
- Samtanagar
- Shah Colony Osmanpura
- Saadat Nagar
- Sabzi Mandi Paithan Gate
- Samarth Nagar
- South Aurangabad
- Satara Parisar
- Sawarkar Nagar
- Seven Hills
- Shah Bazar
- Shah Ganj
- Shahnoorwadi
- Raj Nagar (Shahnoorwadi)
- Shantinath Housing Society
- Shantiniketan Colony
- Shah Noor Miyan Darghah
- Shendra MIDC
- Shivaji Nagar
- Sutgirni Road Stadium
- Shivsamadhan Colony
- Shivshankar Colony
- Silk Mills
- Silli Khana
- Town Hall
- Tilaknagar
- Rauf Colony
- TV Center.
- Ulkanagari
- Vasundhara Colony
- Vaishali Nagar
- Vishram Baugh Colony
- Visvabharti Colony
- Vyankatesh Colony
- West Aurangabad
- Yashodhara Colony
- Yunus Colony
- Zambad Estate
