= MIT (disambiguation) =

MIT is the Massachusetts Institute of Technology, a private research university in Cambridge, Massachusetts, United States.

MIT or mit may also refer to:

== Education ==
=== Institutes of Technology ===
- Machakos Institute of Technology, a college in Machakos, Kenya
- Madras Institute of Technology, an engineering college in Chennai, Tamil Nadu, India (one of the four constituent colleges of Anna University, Chennai)
- Maebashi Institute of Technology, a college in Maehashi, Gunma, Japan
- Maharaja Institute of Technology, an engineering and management university in Arasur, Coimbatore, Tamil Nadu, India
- Maharashtra Institute of Technology, a university in Pune, Maharashtra, India
- Mallabhum Institute of Technology an Engineering college in Bishnupur, West Bengal
- Mandalay Institute of Technology, renamed Mandalay Technological University
- Manipal Institute of Technology, an engineering college in Manipal, Karnataka, India under Manipal University
- Manukau Institute of Technology, a tertiary institute in Auckland, New Zealand
- Mapúa Institute of Technology, renamed to Mapúa University, a university in Manila, Philippines
- Marathwada Institute of Technology an institute in Aurangabad, Maharashtra, India
- Massachusetts Institute of Technology, a university in Cambridge, Massachusetts.
- Melbourne Institute of Technology, a private higher education provider in Australia
- Milwaukee Institute of Technology, predecessor of Milwaukee Area Technical College in Milwaukee, Wisconsin, United States (1951–1968)
- Misamis Institute of Technology, Ozamiz City, Philippines, maritime, engineering, computing courses etc.
- Monterrey Institute of Technology and Higher Education, a university in Monterrey, México
- Muroran Institute of Technology, a college in Muroran, Hokkaido, Japan
- Musashi Institute of Technology, a college in Setagaya, Tokyo, Japan
- Muzaffarpur Institute of Technology, an engineering college in Muzaffarpur, Bihar, India

=== Other uses in education ===
- Management of Information Technology, a postgraduate degree program at McIntire School of Commerce
- Master of Information Technology, an alternative name for a Master of Science in Information Technology degree
- Myanmar Institute of Theology, a theological institute in Yangon, Myanmar

== Government ==
- Major Investigation Team, a British police homicide squad
- Ministero delle Infrastrutture e dei Trasporti, the Italian Ministry of Infrastructure and Transport
- The National Intelligence Organization of Turkey, known under the Turkish acronym MİT, standing for "Millî İstihbarat Teşkilâtı"
- Ministry of Information Technology (disambiguation)

== Arts and media ==
- Iwate Menkoi Television, a television station in Iwate Prefecture, Japan
- Made in Thailand, an album by Carabao
- Mechanoid Invasion Trilogy
- MIT: Murder Investigation Team, a British television programme

== Science and technology ==
- Massachusetts Investors Trust, a mutual fund founded in 1924 in the United States; see MFS Investment Management

=== Biology and medicine ===
- Melodic Intonation Therapy
- Methylisothiazolinone, a preservative
- Mit (butterfly), a genus of butterflies in the subtribe Moncina
- Monoiodotyrosine, a precursor to the thyroid hormones triiodothyronine (T3) and thyroxine (T4)
- Multiple impact therapy, a group psychotherapy technique

=== Computing and electronics ===
- Metal–insulator transition
- MIT BBS, a Chinese online forum
- MIT License, a license for the use of certain types of computer software

== Other uses ==
- Made in Taiwan, describes products produced in Taiwan
- Manzanillo International Terminal, Panama
- Market if touched, a type of order that will be executed when the price is touched
- Mujahidin Indonesia Timur, an Indonesian terrorist group
- Southern Puebla Mixtec language (ISO 639-3 code: mit)

== See also ==
- Mitt (disambiguation)
