= Jawaharlal Nehru Engineering College =

Engineering college in Maharashtra, India

Coordinates: 19.8806°N 75.3560°E

Jawaharlal Nehru College of Engineering
- Type: Private
- Established: 1983
- Parent institution: Mahatma Gandhi Mission
- Affiliations: MGM University, Chhatrapati Sambhajinagar
- Principal: Dr. Vijaya Musande
- Location: Chhatrapati Sambhajinagar, Maharashtra, 431003, India
- Campus: Urban
- Website: www.jnec.org
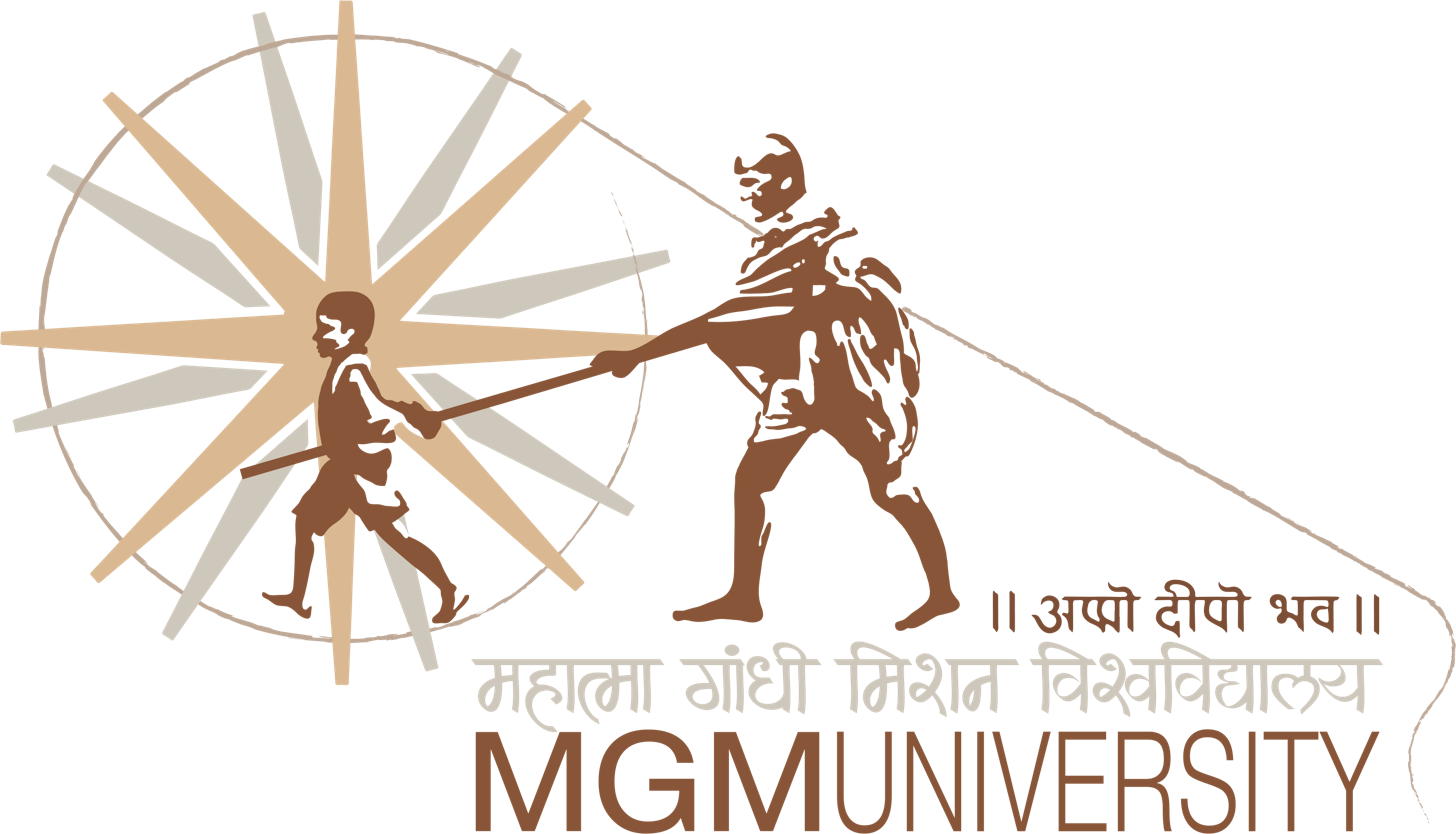

The Jawaharlal Nehru Engineering College (JNEC) is an engineering college in Aurangabad CIDCO, India. It was established in 1983 and is affiliated with the Dr. Babasaheb Ambedkar Technological University in Maharashtra.

Jawaharlal Nehru Engineering College became affiliated with MGM University in 2019.

The school is financed and run by the Mahatma Gandhi Mission. Dr. H. H. Shinde is the Chief of Examination at MGM University, the parent organization of JNEC.

Dr. Vijaya Musande assumed charge as the Principal of Jawaharlal Nehru Engineering College (JNEC) on Friday, 27 December 2024, becoming the first female Principal in the institute’s history.

== History ==
MGM established an educational trust in 1982 under the guidance of former Education Minister Shri Kamalkishore Kadam and a group of founder members, mostly made up of academics. The trust established its pioneer institute in the historical city of Aurangabad, home to the UNESCO World Heritage Sites the Ajanta Caves & Ellora Caves, but lacking in premier educational institutes.

== Gallery ==
Views of the campus and facilities at Jawaharlal Nehru Engineering College, Chhatrapati Sambhajinagar, Maharashtra.

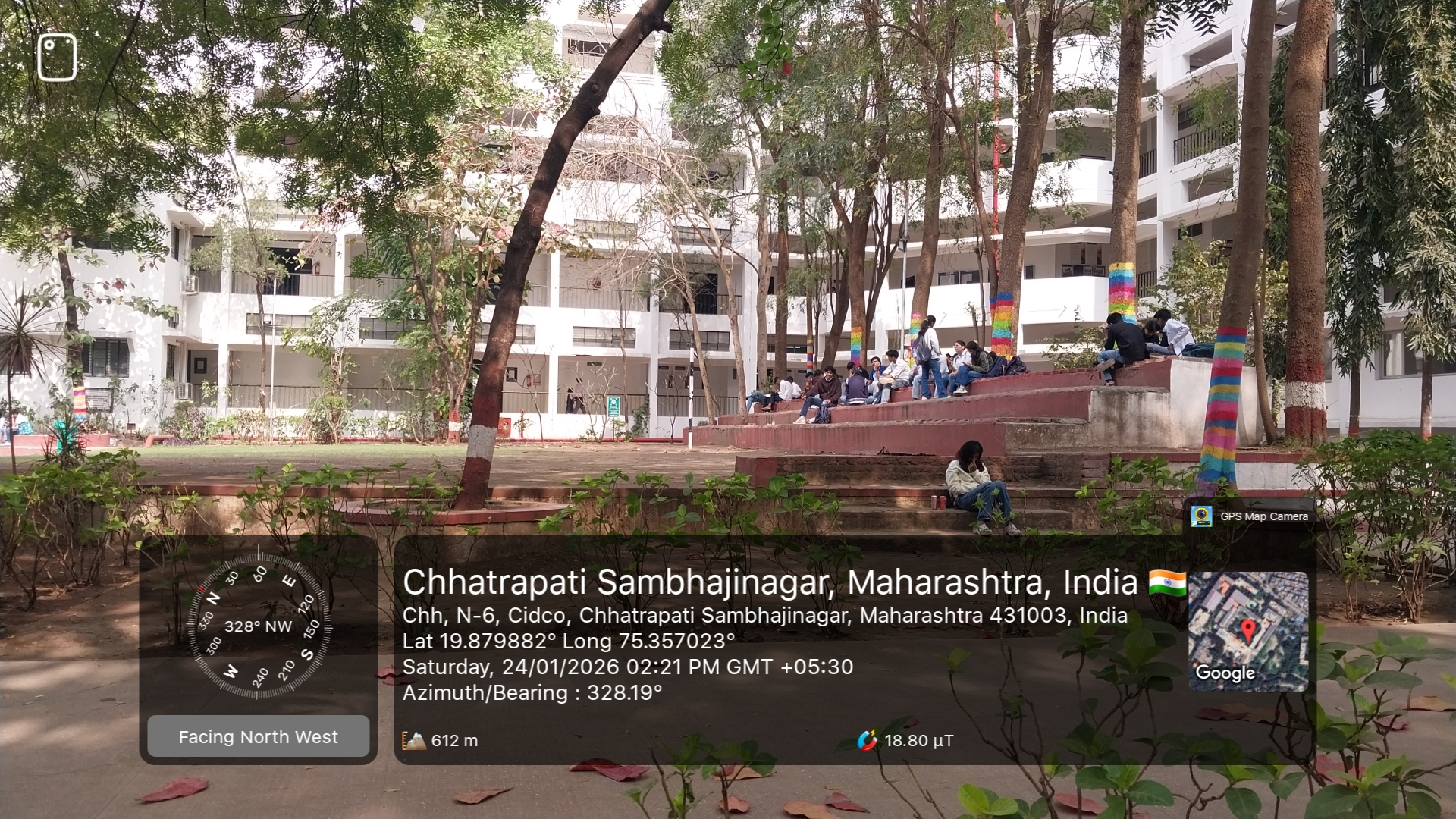
Step seating area near the admission office gate

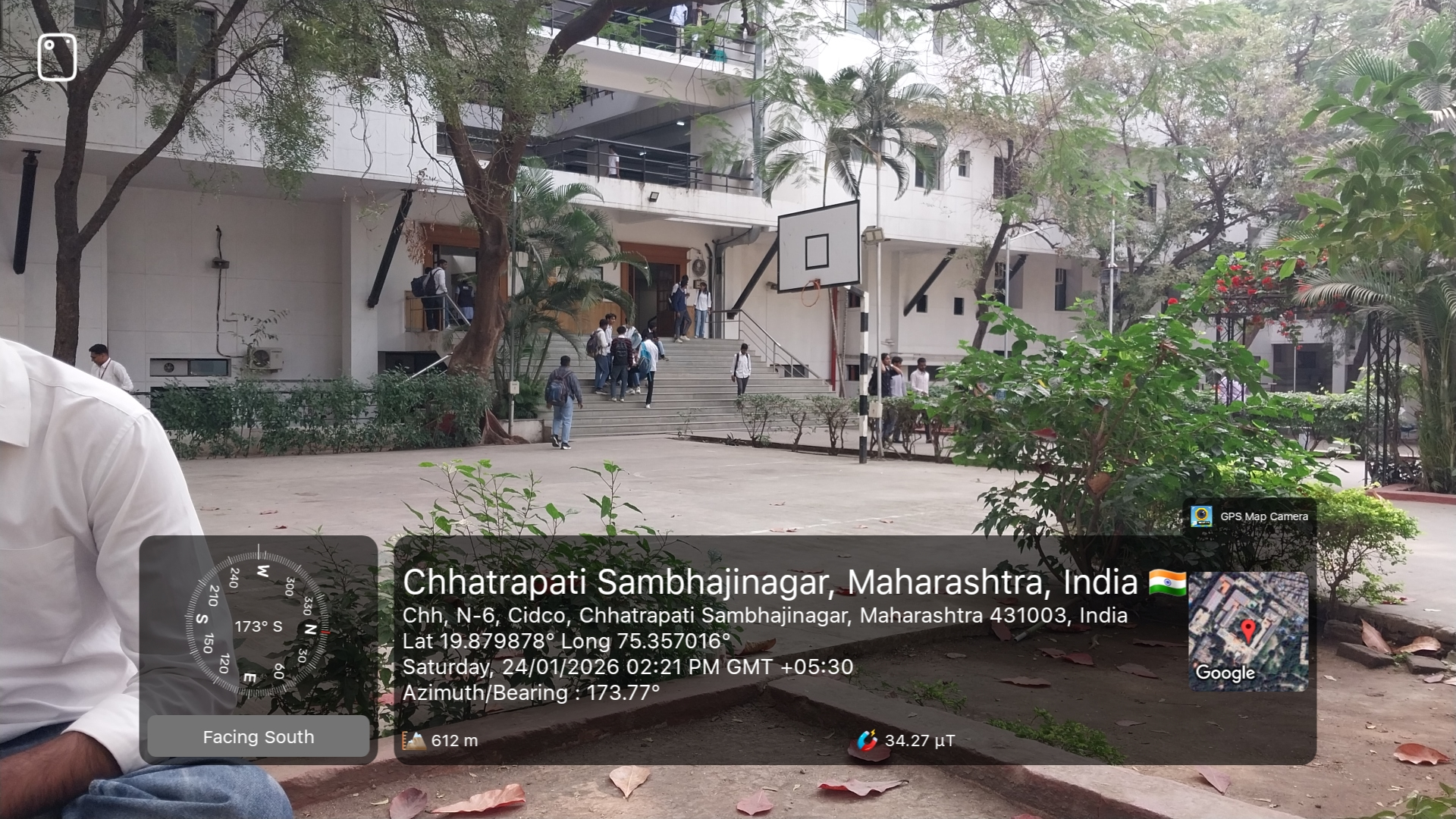
Office gates of Jawaharlal Nehru Engineering College

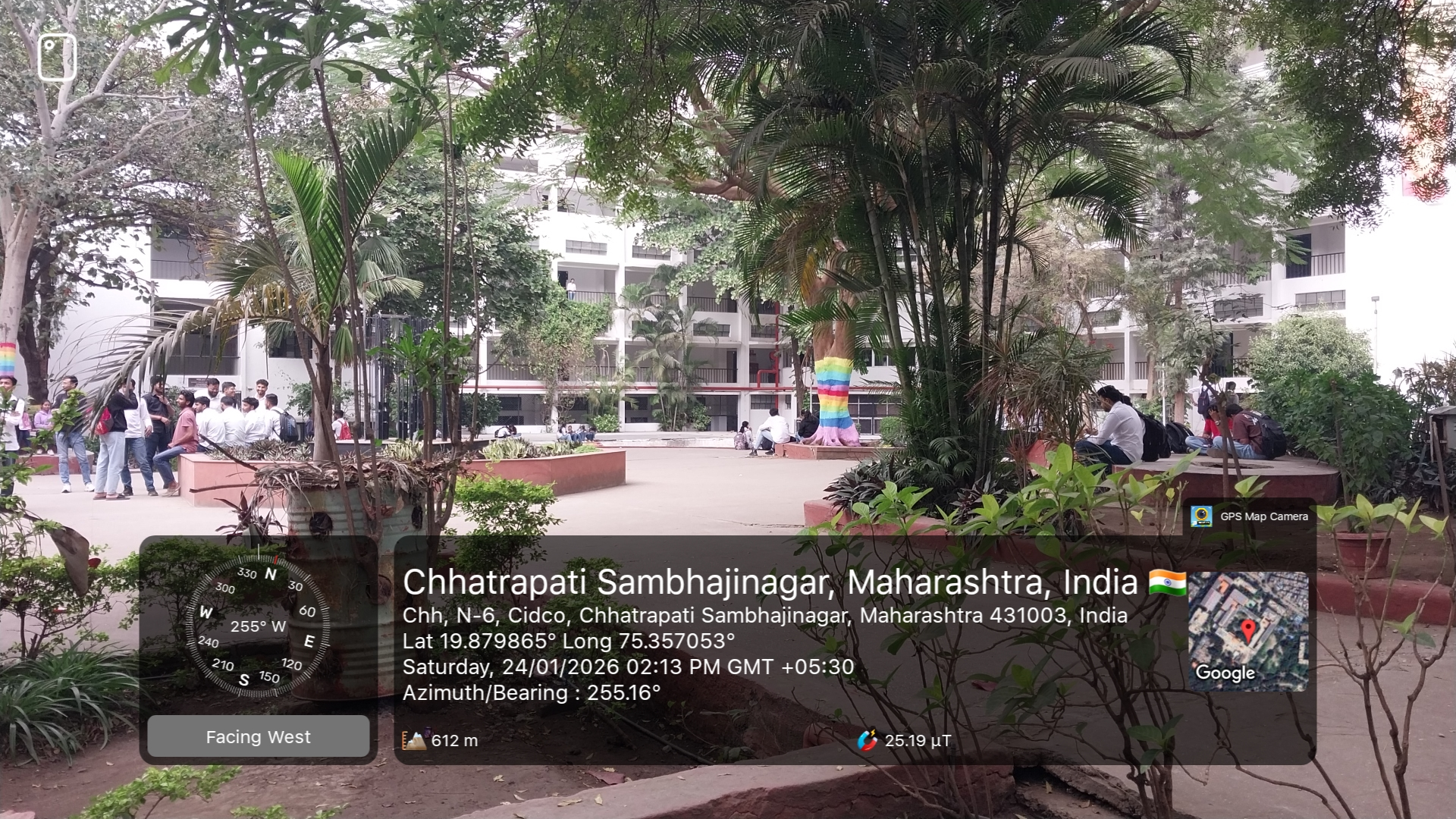
Seating area near the Buddha fountain

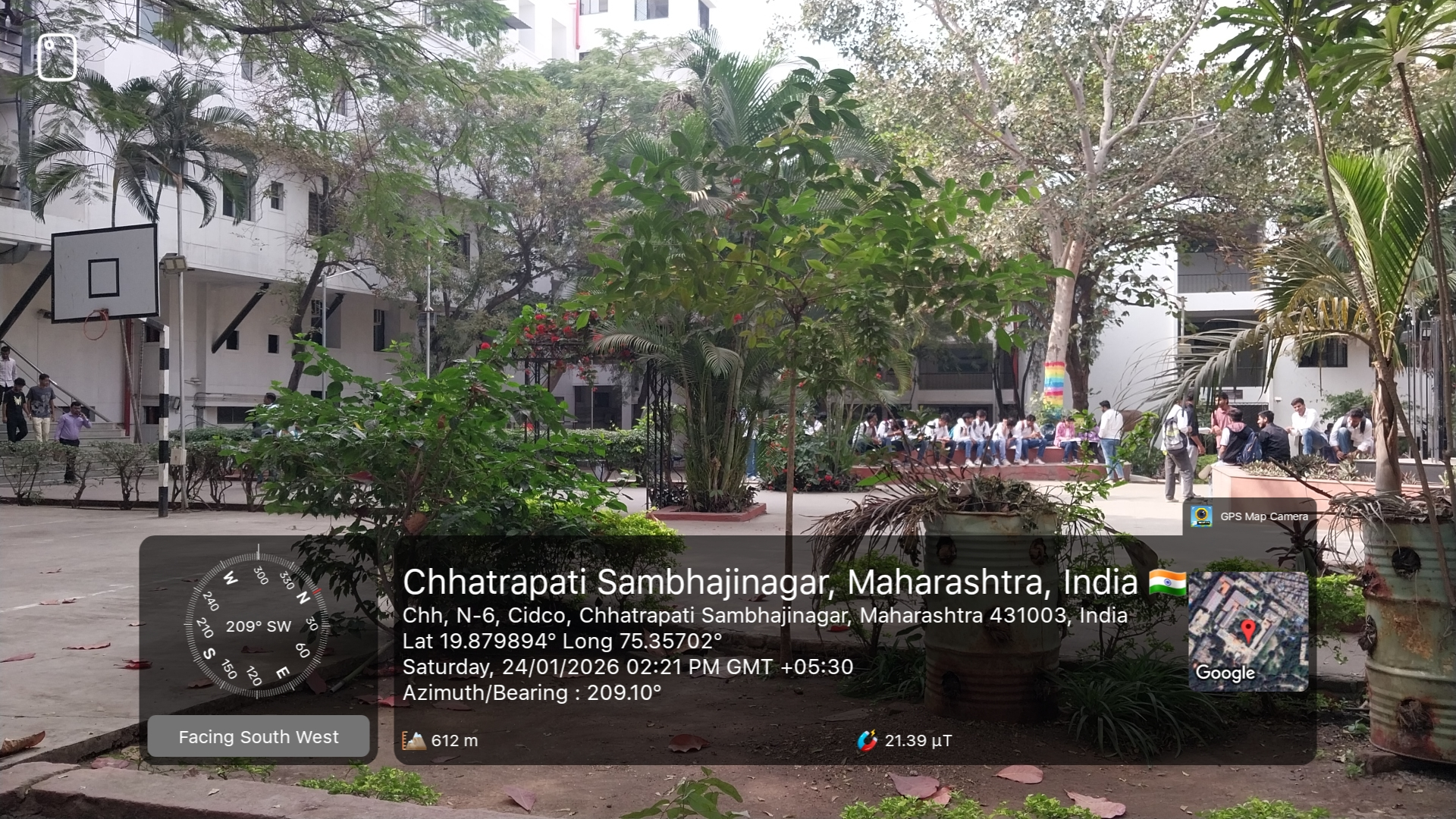
Seating area in front of the admission office

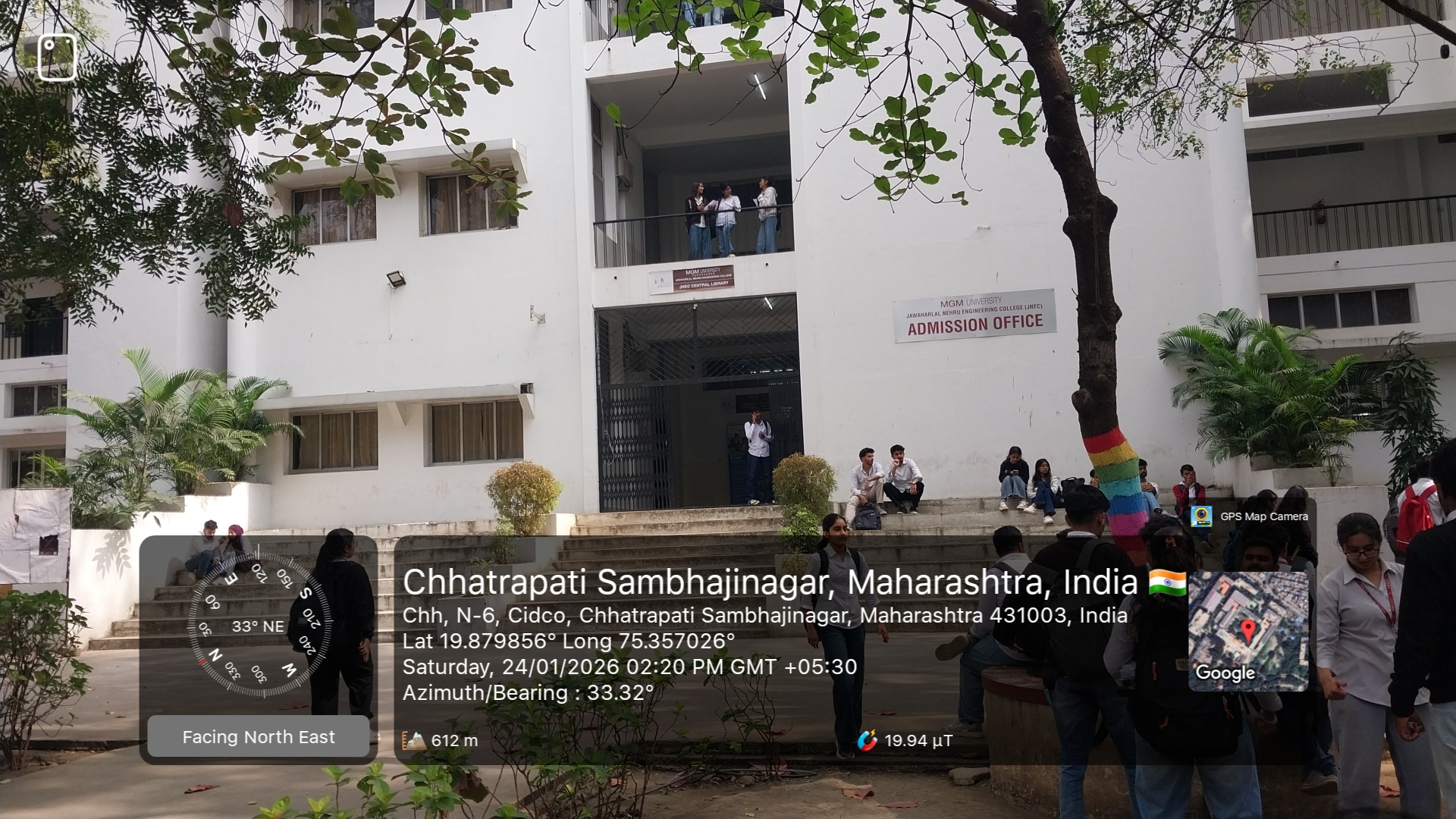
Admission office gate of Jawaharlal Nehru Engineering College

== Campus ==
The foundation stone of the existing MGM's JNEC building was laid on 14 November 1985 by Sharad Pawar, the Chief Minister of Maharashtra. The college started functioning as a part of Vivekanand College, in Samarth Nagar, Aurangabad, but in September 1988 it was moved to a new location. Initially, the college campus consisted of one arm of the building (the North arm), with the chemistry lab, workshop, production lab, and library spread about it. The computer lab was opened with much fanfare in 1987. The current campus hosts dormitories for boys and girls, a sports facility, a canteen, and a bank. It is shared with other colleges under the MGM banner.

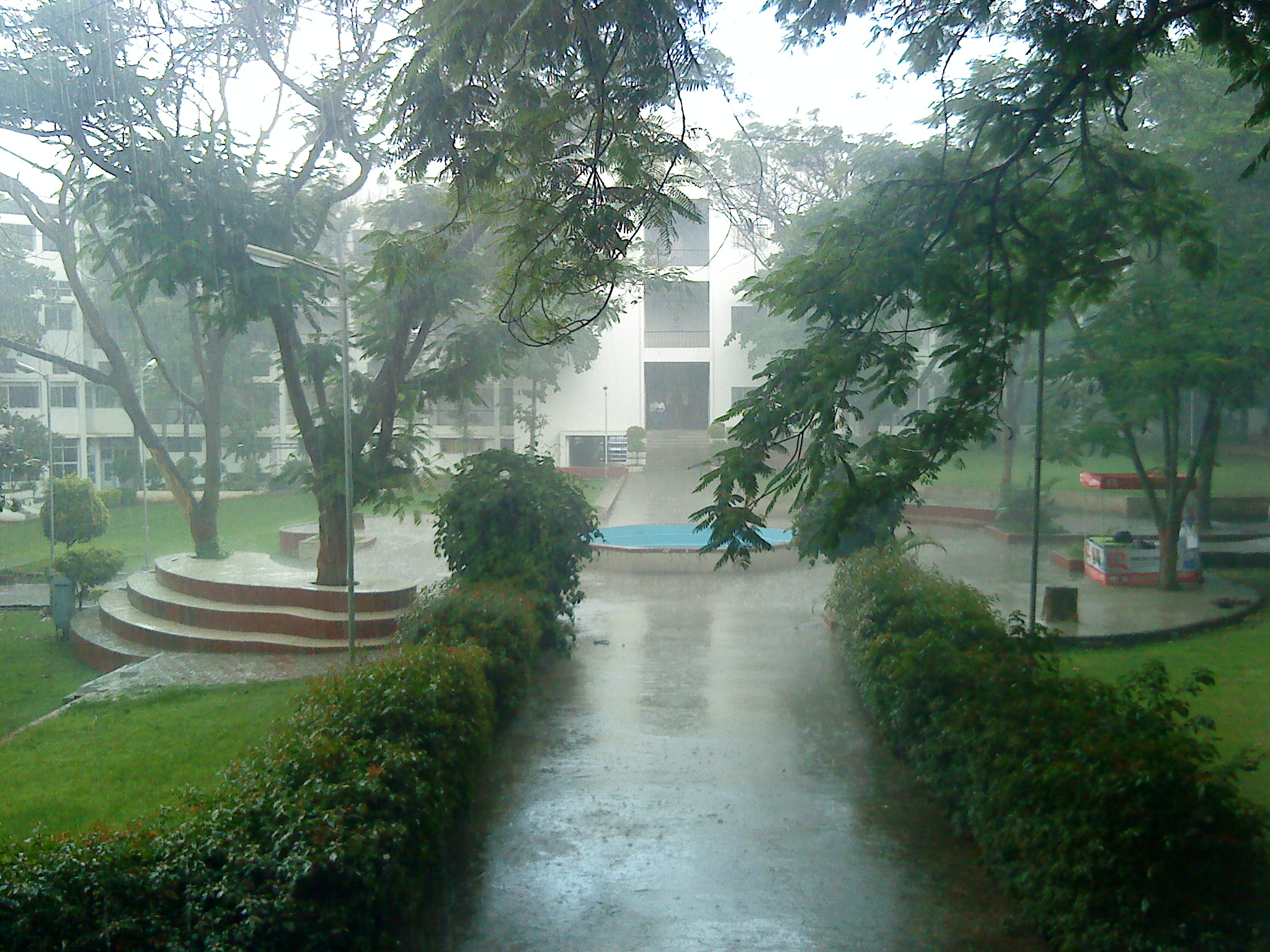
Campus in 2011

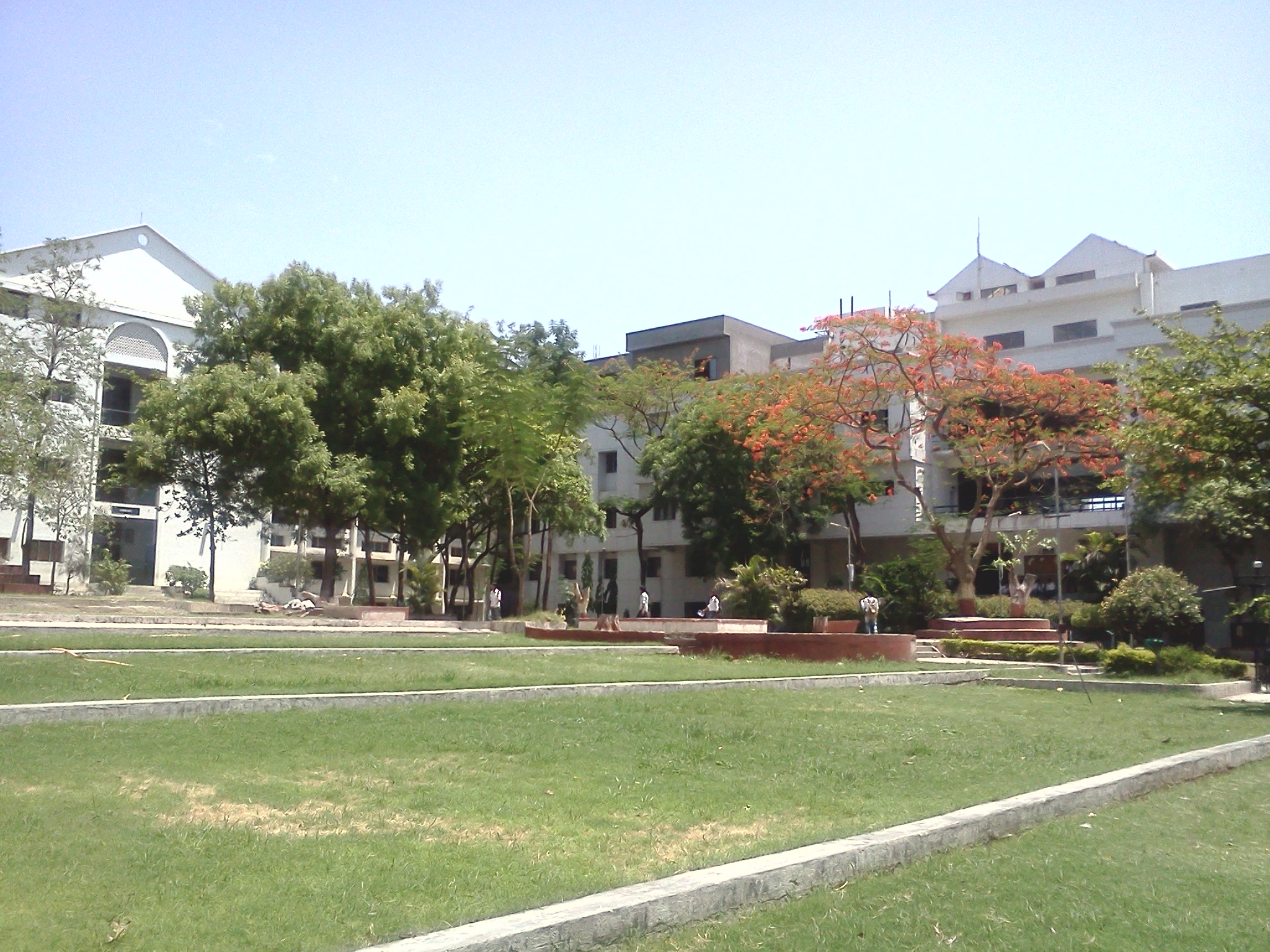
Campus in 2012

=== Sports ===
MGM's Jawaharlal Nehru Engineering College Sports Complex is a sports complex within Jawaharlal Nehru Engineering College. The facilities available for sports activities include a 400-meter synthetic track, a football field-cum-cricket ground with 63.5 meters of boundary, a stadium pavilion, and courts for games like hockey, volleyball, basketball, kho-kho, kabaddi, and ball badminton. Facilities are available for indoor games like table tennis, carom, chess, wrestling, weightlifting, and powerlifting.

== Alumni ==
Since 1983, approximately 10,000 students have pursued their bachelor's at the college. The college established an alumni association to keep in touch with alumni. Previously, an informal alumni association existed, but it is now registered under the association vide letter no MHA/497/04 dated 30 July 2004. As of September 2012, JNEC Alumni association has 2041 members.

=== Executive body ===
- President: Shankar Jhunjhunwala
- Vice President: Shrikant Badve
- Secretary: Jeevan Salunke
- Treasurer: B.M. Patil
- Faculty Leader: P.B. Murmude
- Convener: A.B. Kulkarni

== Notable alumni ==
- Captain Mangal Kakkad – Directing Staff, Indian Navy, National Defence College
- Anjali Sinha – Program Director, Asia Pacific Client Center Transformation, IBM, New Delhi
- Suren Jain – Managing Director, Jaiprakash Power Ventures, New Delhi

== See also ==
- MGM College of Food Technology
- MGM University
