= Naan qalia =

Bread made in a tandoor, mixture of mutton or beef and various spices

Naan Qalia
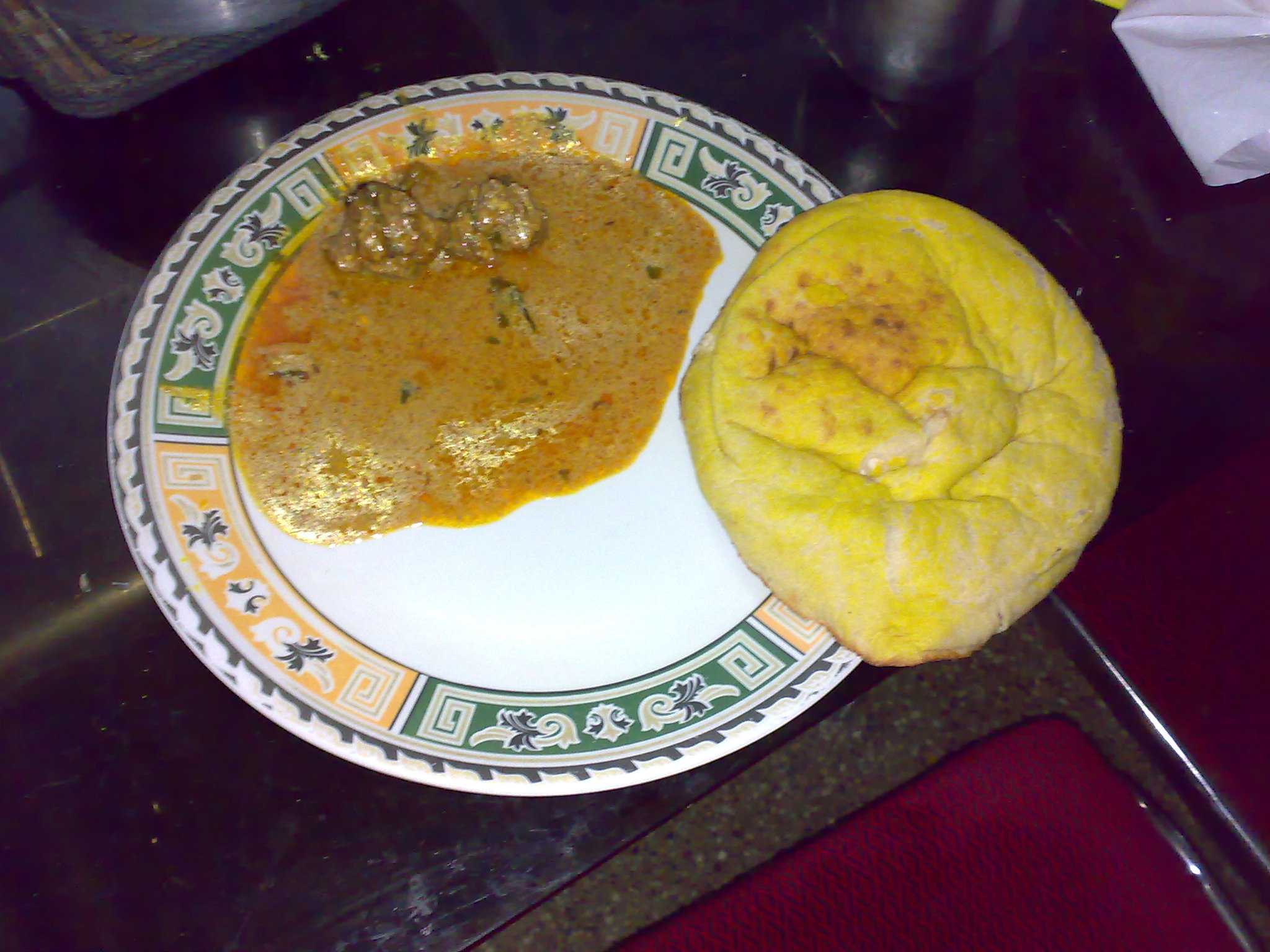
- Naan Bread and Gravy of Khaliya Serve in Plate.
- Alternative names: Naan Qalia
- Place of origin: India
- Region or state: South Asia, Maharashtra mainly Aurangabad, Jalna
- Created by: shahi bawarchis of Tughlaq dynasty
- Serving temperature: Occasions, Muslim Weddings
- Main ingredients: Coconut, Poppy Seeds (Khush-Khush), Mutton / Beef, Buchanania lanzan, dahi (yogurt) or Lemon

Naan Qalia is a dish that originates from Chatrapati Sambhajinagar, in India. It is a concoction of mutton and a variety of spices. Naan is a bread made in a tandoor (hot furnace), while khaliya is a mixture of mutton or beef and various spices.

== History ==
When Mohammad Tughlaq shifted his capital from Delhi to Daulatabad, there was a mass exodus of people from Delhi to Daulatabad. On the way to Daulatabad, the huge army of Tughlaq was exhausted. It was a difficult task to provide such a big army with food. So the shahi bawarchis (royal cooks) dug a hot furnace and rolled out thousands of naan. Meanwhile, qalia was prepared by slowly cooking either Beef or Mutton and adding number of local spices in the huge degh cauldron. Later on, this dish was commonly eaten by sipahi Soldiers and was also called 'siphaaiyon ka khana' or 'fauji ka khana'. It is commonly made in Aurangabad for weddings and other special occasions.

== Traditional preparation ==
The naan are prepared in an open clay oven, which is mounted in a hole in the ground. The fire is from a side hole. The baker (generally called bhatiyara) sits next to the oven and places the naan in the oven for baking, these naan are picked out with specially designed rods. These Naan are quite fluffy. Each of the naan gets a brush of turmeric and jaggery water as soon as they are baked. This gives the naan golden colour and also makes it last longer.

The qalia is a soupy curry, made with a number of ingredients over a long process. There is a number of spice variations and the ingredients across the towns close to Aurangabad. The qalia from Aurangabad is yogurt based, whereas the one from Khuldabad is lemon based. The qalia is prepared in a big cauldron called degh which has a top layer of oil. This spicy oil on top is called tari.

== See also ==
- List of lamb dishes
