= Mitts =

Mitts is a surname. Notable people with the surname include:

- Emma Mitts, alderman of the 37th ward of the City of Chicago
- Harry Mitts, defendant in Bobby v. Mitts 2010 term per curiam opinion of the Supreme Court of the United States
- Heather Mitts (born 1978), American professional soccer player
- Brian "Mitts" Daniels, guitarist of Madball

== See also ==
- Mitten, a type of glove commonly referred to as mitts
- Mitt (disambiguation)
