= Mitt =

Mitt may refer to:

== Gloves ==
- Mitten, a garment covering the whole hand
- Baseball mitt, a leather glove worn by baseball players on defense

== Arts and media ==
- Mitt (film), a 2014 documentary film about Mitt Romney
- The Mitt, a bronze sculpture of a baseball mitt in T-Mobile Park, Seattle, Washington, United States

== People ==
- Mitt (name), a surname and given name
- William Mitten (1819–1906), English authority on bryophytes and chemist, whose botanical author abbreviation is "Mitt."

== Acronyms ==
MITT may refer to:

- Moscow Institute of Thermal Technology
- Military transition team (MiTT)
- Modified intention-to-treat analysis, of a randomized controlled trial in medicine

== See also ==
- Mitts, a surname
- MIT (disambiguation)
