= Himroo =

Handwoven silk brocade from India

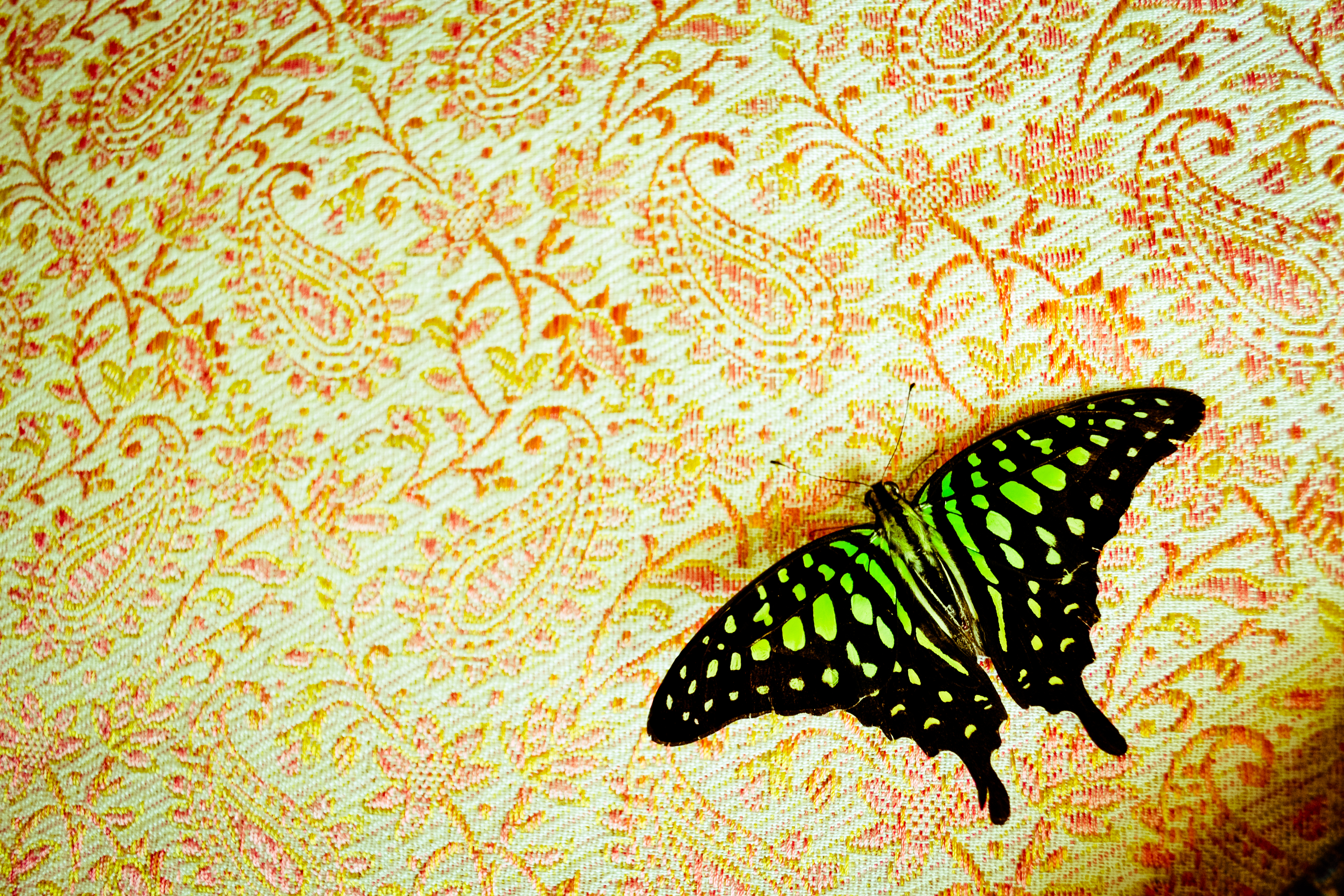
Aurangabad Himroo design shawl bedsheet

Himroo shawls

Himroo is a fabric made of silk and cotton, which is grown locally in Aurangabad. Himroo was brought to Aurangabad in the reign of Mohammad Tughlaq, when he had shifted his capital from Delhi to Daulatabad, Aurangabad. The word himroo originated from Persian word Hum-ruh which means 'similar'. Himroo is a replication of Kinkhwab, which was woven with pure golden and silver threads in former times, and was meant for the royal families.

Himroo uses Persian designs, and is very characteristic and distinctive in appearance. Himroo from Aurangabad is in demand for its unique style and design. Some historians believe that Himroo was the innovation of local craftsmen with very little Persian influence.

== History ==
According to historians this art originated in Persia, though it has not been proved, himroo is associated with the times of Mohammad Tughlaq who ruled in the 14th century. When Mohammad Tughlaq shifted his capital from Delhi to Daulatabad many weavers came and settled here. During the migration, the weavers instead of returning to Delhi chose to stay back here. They did not want to go back to Delhi. During the reign of Malik Ambar many people were attracted to the city and came and settled here from far and wide. Aurangabad during Aurangzeb's Governorship and the times of Mughal became the capital and the weavers had a gala time making money and becoming prosperous. The handicraft industry in Aurangabad attracted hundreds of craftsman and artisans. Members of the royal family and an elite few used the famous Aurangabad himroo. Himroo weaving is very characteristic and different. Fabrics and shawls from Aurangabad are much in demand for their unique style and design.
