= Mitt (name) =

Given name and family name

Mitt is both a surname and a given name. Notable people with the name include:

== Surname ==
- Aleksander Mitt (1903–1942), Estonian speed skater
- Arnold Mitt (born 1988), Estonian basketball player
- Tarmo Mitt (born 1977), Estonian strongman

== Given name ==
- Mitt Romney (born 1947), American politician and businessman
- Milton Romney (1899–1975), former American football player

== See also ==
- Mitt (disambiguation)
- Mito (name)
