= Aurangabad =

Metropolis in Maharashtra, India

- City
- Chhatrapati Sambhajinagar
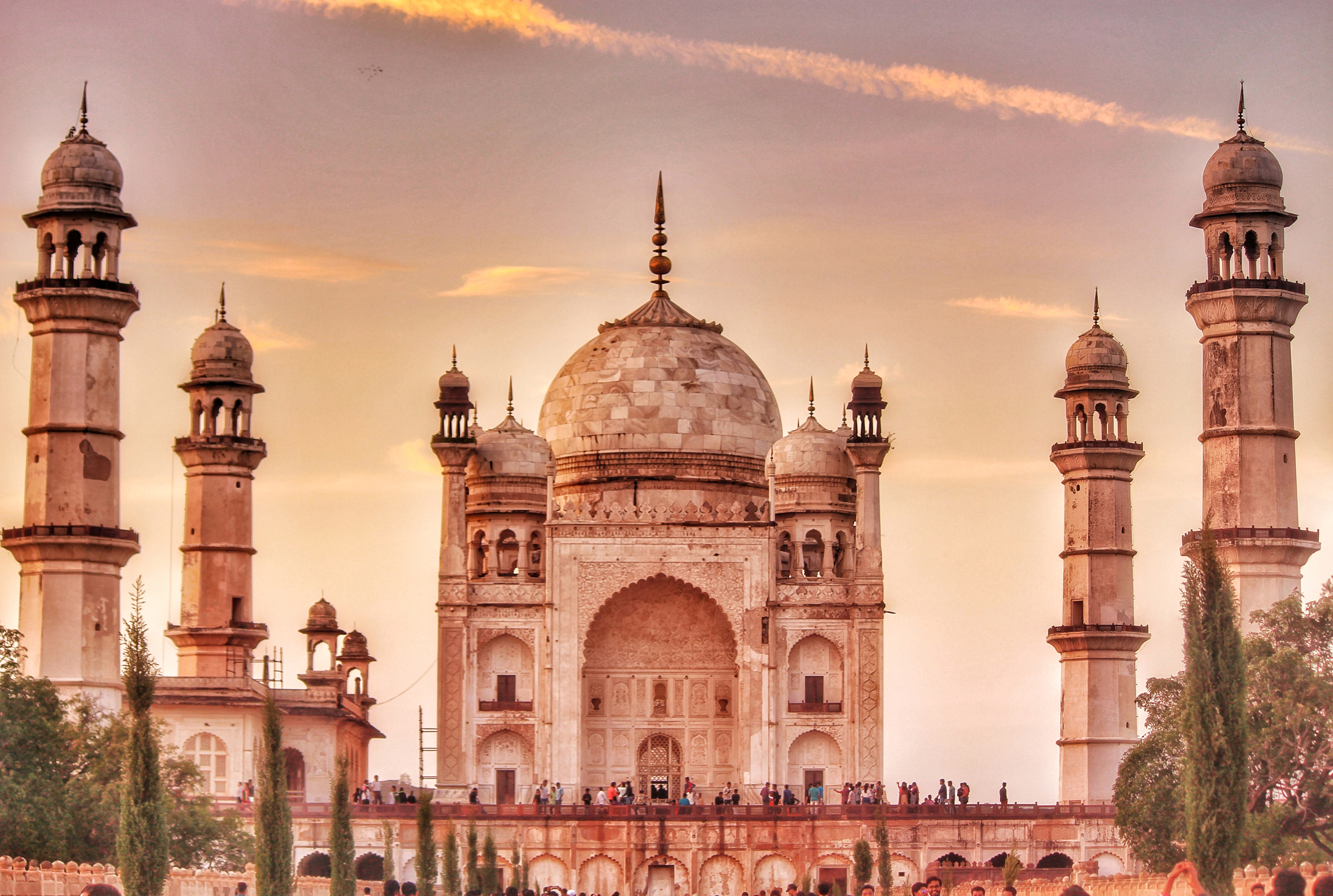
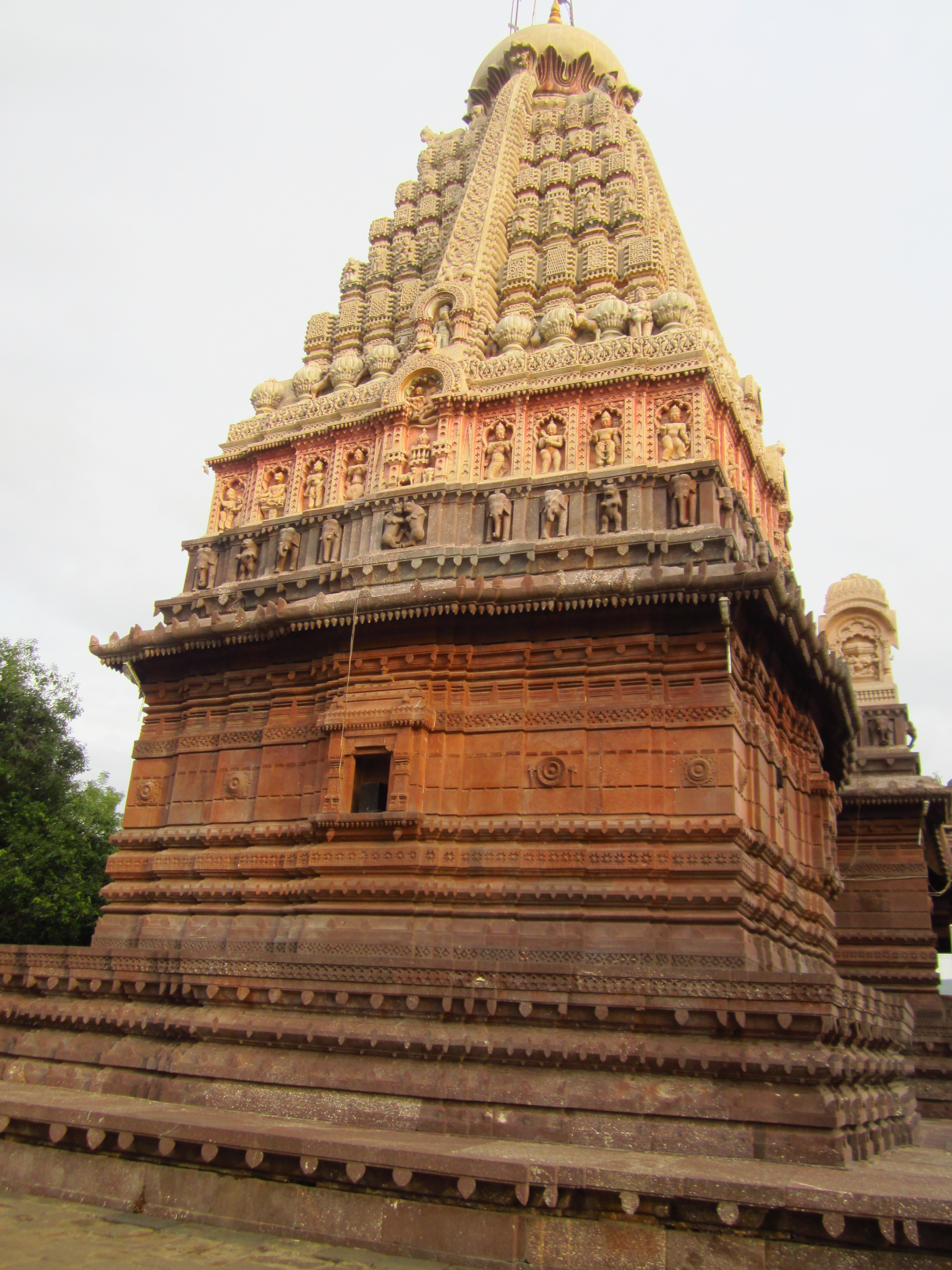
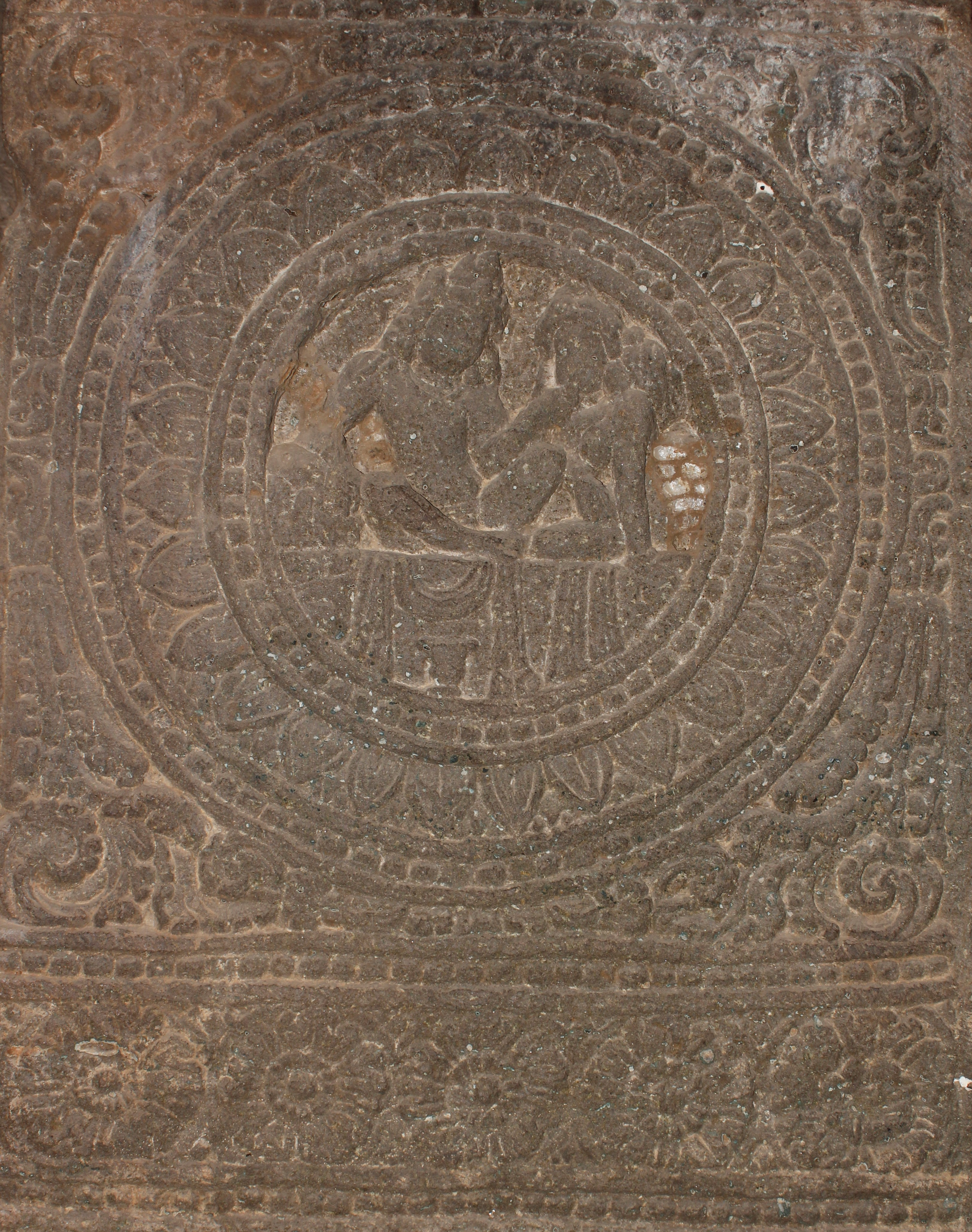
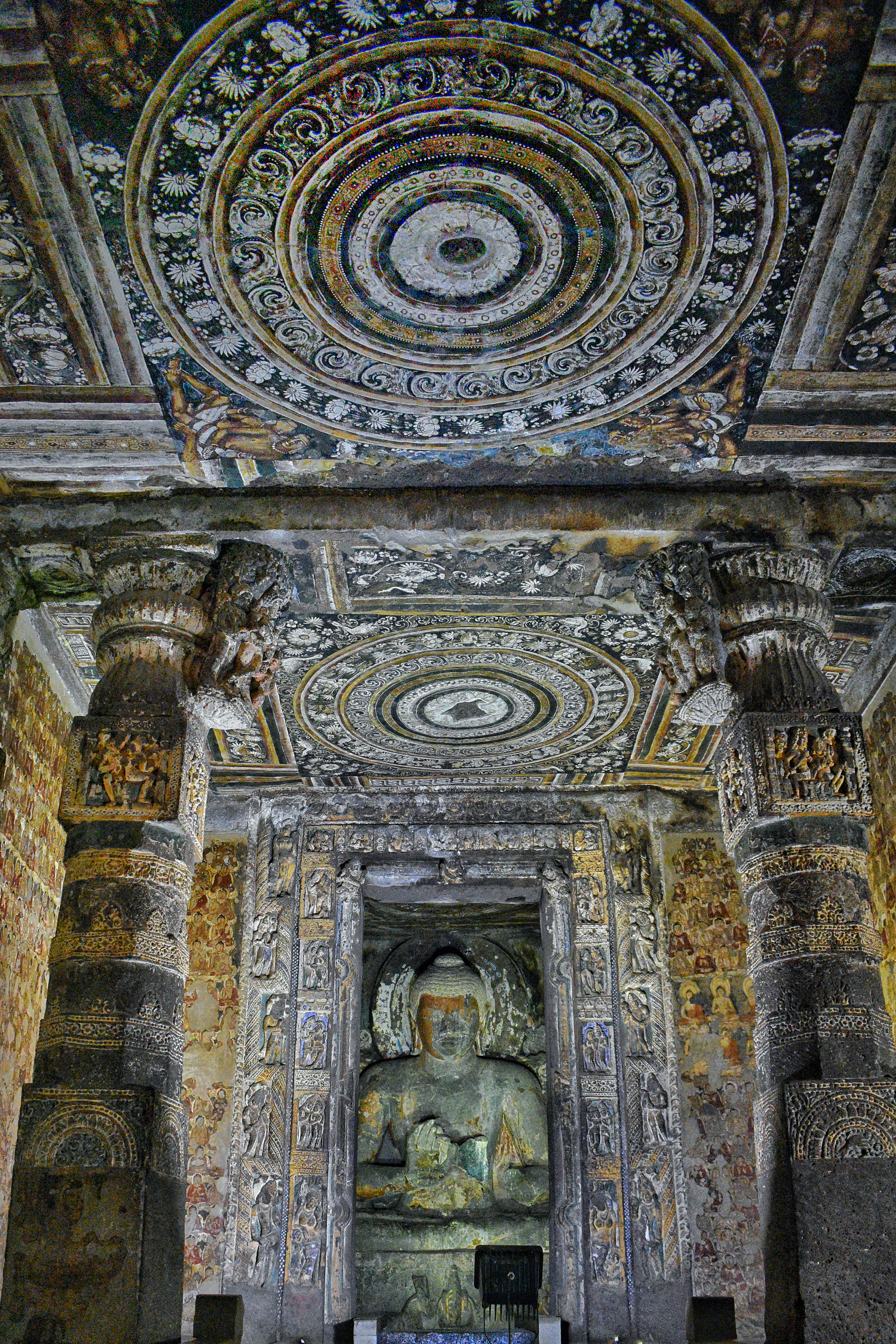
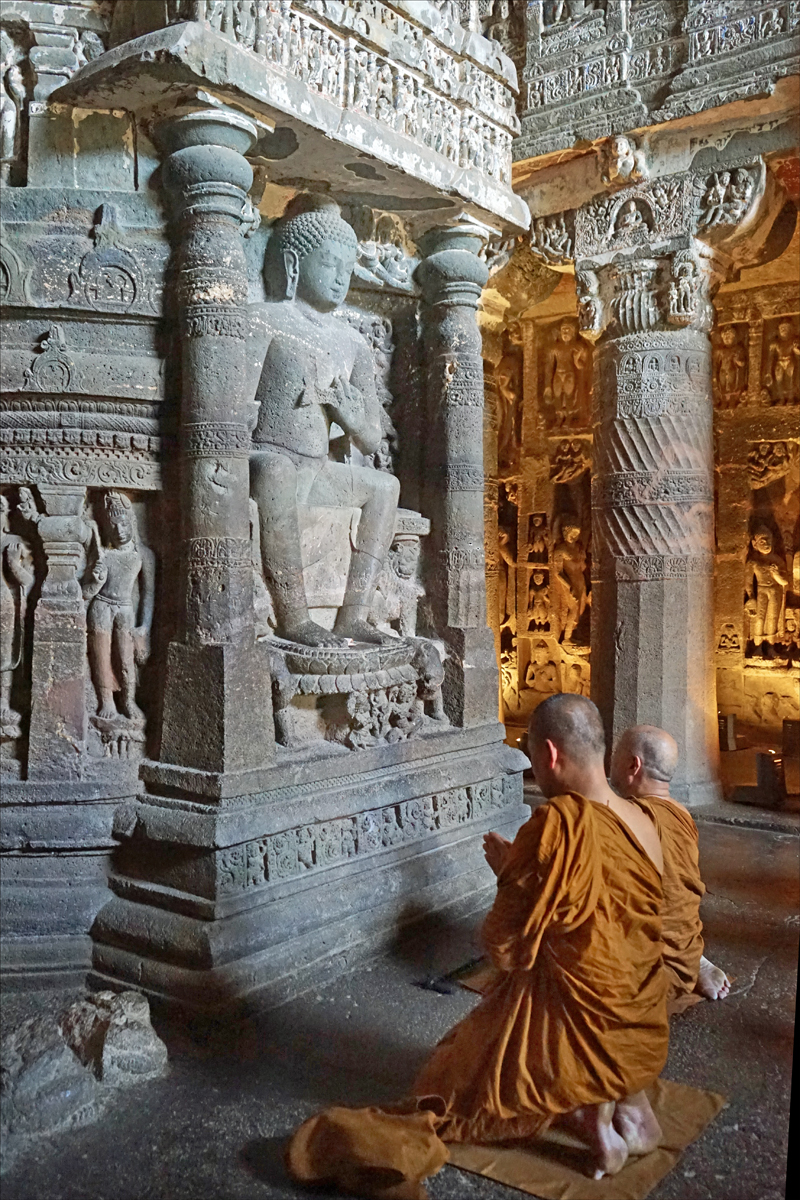
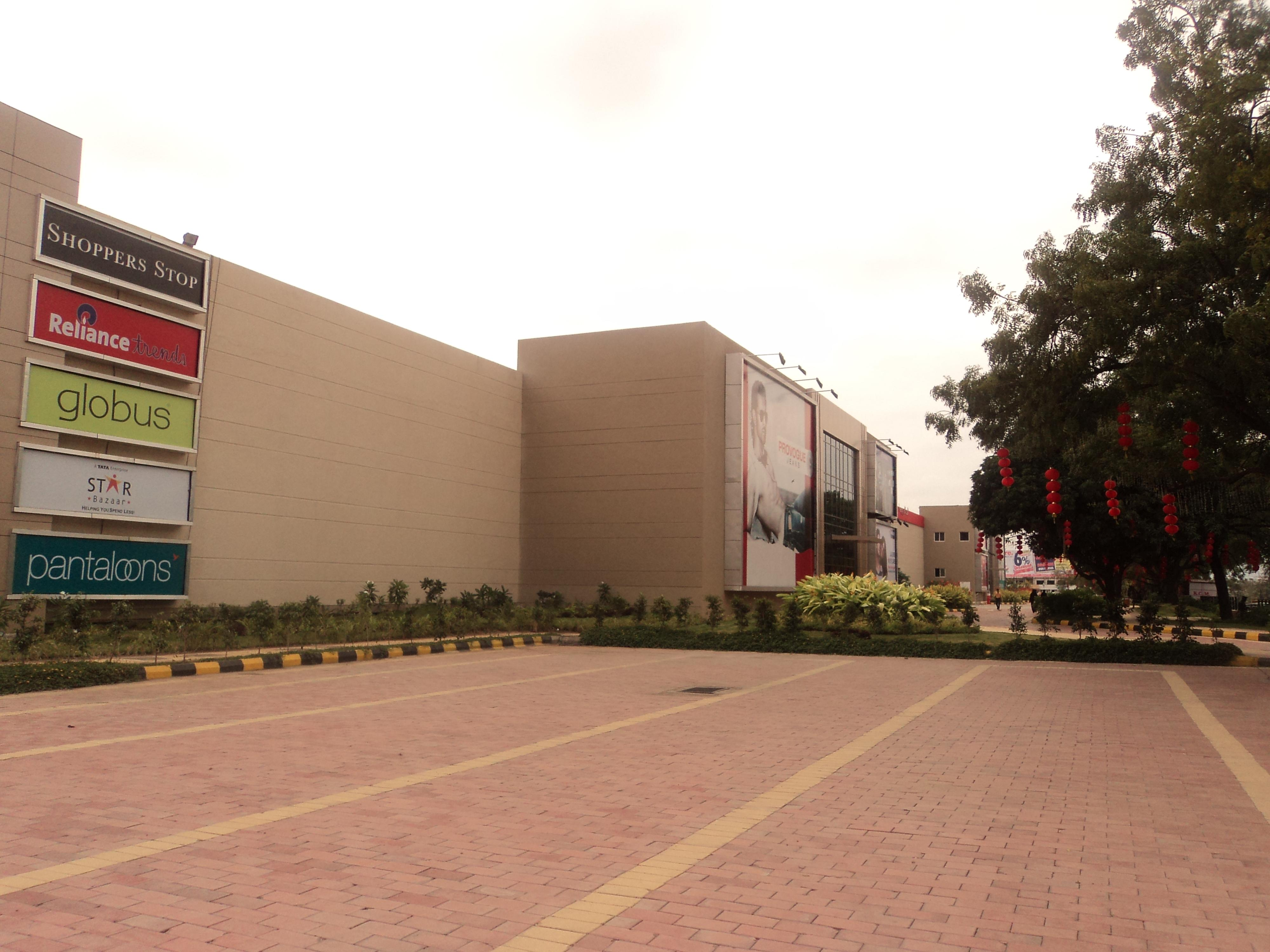
- From top, then left to right: Bibi Ka Maqbara, Grishneshwar Temple, Carvings in caves of Aurangabad, Prozone Mall
- Nickname: City of Gates
- Interactive map of Aurangabad
- Coordinates: 19.88°N 75.32°E
- Country: India
- State: Maharashtra
- District: Aurangabad
- Established: 1610; 416 years ago
- Founder: Malik Ambar
- Named for: Aurangzeb

Government
  - Type: Municipal Corporation
  - Body: Aurangabad Municipal Corporation
  - Mayor: Sameer Rajurkar
  - MP: Sandipanrao Bhumre (Shiv Sena)
  - MLAs: Sanjay Shirsat (Aurangabad West); Atul Moreshwar Save (Aurangabad East); Pradeep Jaiswal (Aurangabad Central)

Area
  - City: 141 km^{2} (54 sq mi)
- Elevation: 568 m (1,864 ft)

Population (2011)
  - City: 1,175,116
  - Rank: India: 32nd Maharashtra: 6th Marathwada: 1st
  - Density: 8,330/km^{2} (21,600/sq mi)
  - Metro: 1,193,167
  - Metro rank: 43rd
- Demonym(s): Aurangabadkar, Aurangabadi
- Time zone: UTC+5:30 (IST)
- PIN: 431 001
- Telephone code 0240: 0240
- Vehicle registration: MH 20
- Nominal GDP: US$7 billion+(2019-20)
- Official language: Marathi
- Website: chhsambhajinagarmc.org

Aurangabad, officially Chhatrapati Sambhajinagar is a city in the Indian state of Maharashtra. It is the administrative headquarters of Aurangabad district and is the largest city in the Marathwada region. Located on a hilly upland terrain in the Deccan Traps, Aurangabad is the fifth-most populous urban area in Maharashtra, after Mumbai, Pune, Nagpur and Nashik, with a population of 1,175,116.

The city is a major production center of cotton textile and artistic silk fabrics. Several prominent educational institutions, including Dr. Babasaheb Ambedkar Marathwada University, are located in the city. The city is also a popular tourism hub, with attractions like the Ajanta and Ellora caves lying on its outskirts, both of which have been designated as UNESCO World Heritage Sites since 1983, the Aurangabad Caves, Devagiri Fort, Grishneshwar Temple, Jama Mosque, Bibi Ka Maqbara, Himayat Bagh, Panchakki and Salim Ali Lake. Historically, there were 52 gates in Aurangabad, some of them still extant, which have earned Aurangabad the nickname the "City of Gates". In 2019, the Aurangabad Industrial City (AURIC) became the first greenfield industrial smart city of India under the country's flagship Smart Cities Mission.

Paithan, the imperial capital of the Satavahana dynasty (1st century BCE–2nd century CE), as well as Dēvagirī, the capital of the Yadava dynasty (9th century CE–14th century CE), were located within the boundaries of modern Aurangabad. In 1308, the region was annexed by the Delhi Sultanate during the rule of Sultan Alauddin Khalji. In 1327, the capital of the Delhi Sultanate was shifted from Delhi to Daulatabad (in present-day Aurangabad) during the rule of Sultan Muhammad bin Tughluq, who ordered the mass relocation of Delhi's population to Daulatabad. However, Muhammad bin Tughluq reversed his decision in 1334, and the capital was shifted back to Delhi. In 1499, Daulatabad became a part of the Ahmadnagar Sultanate. In 1610, a new city named Khaḍkī was established at the location of modern Aurangabad to serve as the capital of the Ahmadnagar Sultanate by the Ethiopian military leader Malik Ambar, who was brought to India as a slave but rose to become a popular prime minister of the Ahmadnagar Sultanate. Malik Ambar was succeeded by his son Fateh Khan, who changed the name of the city to Fatehnagar. In 1636, Aurangzeb, who was then the Mughal viceroy of the Deccan region, annexed the city into the Mughal Empire. In 1653, Aurangzeb renamed the city as Aurangabad and made it the capital of the Deccan region. In 1724, the Mughal governor of the Deccan, Nizam Asaf Jah I, seceded from the Mughal Empire and founded his own dynasty. The dynasty established the State of Hyderabad, with their capital initially at Aurangabad, until they transferred it to the city of Hyderabad in 1763. Hyderabad State became a princely state during the British Raj and remained so for 150 years (1798–1948). Until 1956, Aurangabad remained part of Hyderabad State. In 1960, Aurangabad and the larger Marathi-speaking Marathwada region became part of the state of Maharashtra.

== History ==
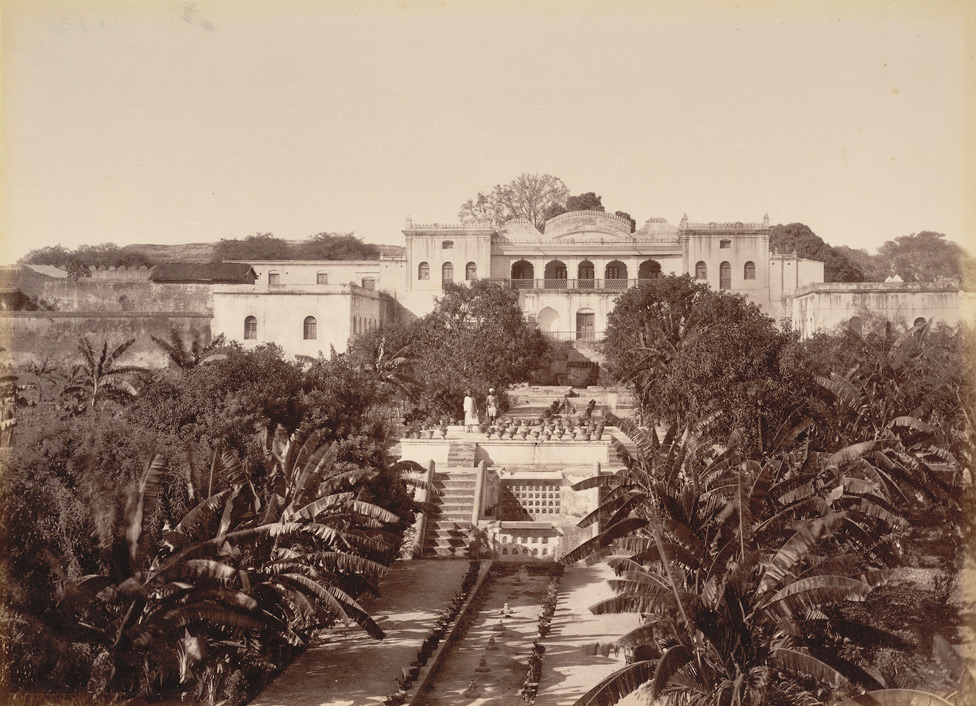
Zeb-un-Nisa's palace, Aurangabad 1880s.

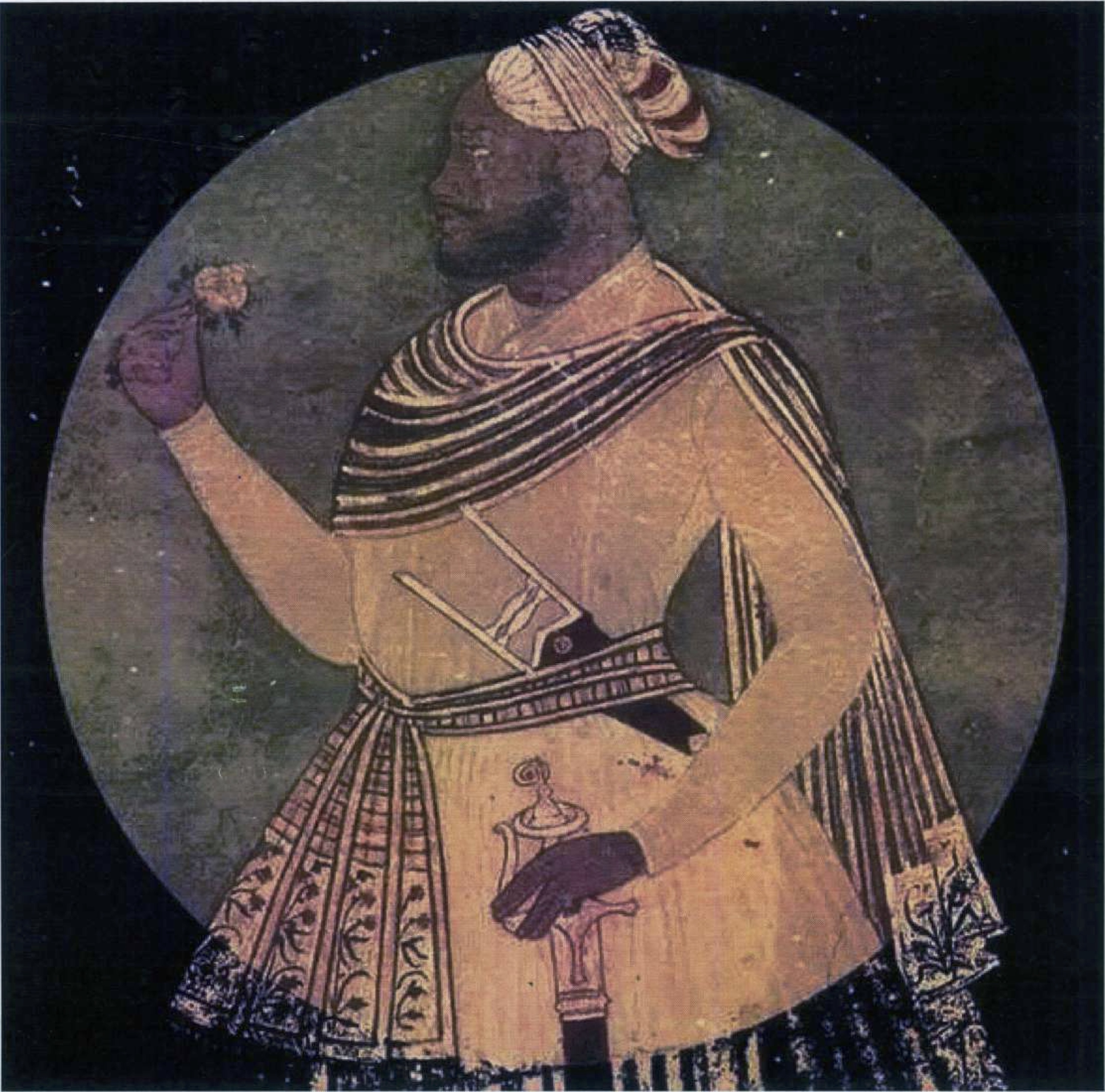
Painting of Malik Ambar of the Ahmadnagar Sultanate, the founder of Khadki (later Aurangabad)

Khaḍkī was the original name of the village which was made a capital city by Malik Ambar, the Prime Minister of Murtaza Nizam Shah II, Sultan of Ahmednagar. Within a decade, Khaḍkī grew into a populous and imposing city. Malik Ambar died in 1626, and was succeeded by his son Fateh Khan, who changed the name of Khaḍkī to Fatehnagar. With the capture of Devagiri Fort by the imperial troops in 1633, the Nizam Shahi dominions, including Fatehnagar, became a possession of the Mughals.

In 1653, when Mughal prince Aurangzeb was appointed the Viceroy of the Deccan for the second time, he made Fatehnagar his capital and renamed it Aurangabad. Aurangabad is sometimes referred to as Khujista Bunyad by the chroniclers of Aurangzeb's reign.

In 1667 Muazzam, son of Aurangzeb, became governor of the province. Before him, Mirza Raja Jai Singh was in charge of this province for some time.

In 1681, after Aurangzeb's coronation as emperor, he shifted his court from the capital city of Delhi to Aurangabad in order to conduct his military campaigns in the Deccan. The presence of Mughal elites in the city led to urban development, and numerous public and private buildings were constructed. Aurangabad had a city wall built encircling it around 1683 in response to Maratha raids, of which several gates still stand, such as the Delhi Gate. Though Aurangzeb chose not to reside in the city after 1684, the city retained its importance as the primary military outpost of the Mughal Deccan, attracting wealth and turning Aurangabad into a centre of trade; the manufacture of embroidered silks emerged during this period and is still practised in Aurangabad today. Mughal Aurangabad was also a cultural hub, serving as an important centre of Persian and Urdu literature. During the Mughal era, Aurangabad had an estimated population of 200,000 people, living in 54 suburbs.

In 1724, Asaf Jah, a Mughal general and Nizam al-Mulk of the Deccan region, decided to secede from the crumbling Mughal Empire, with the intention of founding his own dynasty in the Deccan. Aurangabad continued to be politically and culturally significant for the next 40 years as the capital of Asaf Jah's new dominion, until his son and successor, Nizam Ali Khan Asaf Jah II, transferred the capital to Hyderabad in 1763. The loss of Aurangabad's privileged position led to a period of economic decline; by the beginning of the 19th century, the city had become notably underpopulated, leading to the crippling of its administration, and its buildings were in decay. However, Aurangabad would continue to be important as the "second city" of the Nizam's dominions for the remainder of the polity's lifetime.

In 1816, the British established a cantonment outside Aurangabad (as they did in other parts of the Nizam's dominions), but were discouraged from entering the city proper by the Nizam's officials. As a princely state under British suzerainty, the Nizam's Hyderabad State was quasi-autonomous, meaning that Aurangabad's culture was somewhat free of colonial influence.

Aurangabad began to industrialise in the late 19th century, with the city's first cotton mill being opened in 1889. The population of the city was 30,000 in 1881, growing to 36,000 over the next two decades. Aurangabad was particularly affected by Deccan famines in 1899-1900, 1918, and 1920, causing surges in crime.

In 1903, the British and the Nizam signed a treaty to train the Nizam's army, and it was decided to establish a proper cantonment. Today the cantonment is spread across 2,584 acres (10.46 km^{2}), with a civilian population of 19,274 per the 2001 census.

Following Indian independence, Hyderabad State was annexed into the Indian Union in 1948, and consequently Aurangabad became a part of the Indian Union's Hyderabad State. In 1956, it passed into the newly formed bilingual Bombay State, and in 1960 it became a part of Maharashtra state.

Bal Thackeray in 1988 proposed the city be renamed as Sambhajinagar. The local governing body, Aurangabad Corporation passed a resolution on the name change in 1995. On 29 June 2022, the Shiv Sena-led Maharashtra cabinet approved the renaming of Aurangabad to Sambhaji Nagar, after Sambhaji Bhosale, second Chhatrapati of the Maratha Empire. The decision was challenged in Bombay High Court, who put a restraining order on the use of the new name. On 23 February 2023 the Indian Ministry of Home Affairs approved the proposal to rename Aurangabad. On 7 May 2024, Bombay High Court ruled that the renaming of Aurangabad was legal. Aurangabad railway station was not officially renamed "Chhatrapati Sambhajinagar railway station" until 15 October 2025.

== Geography ==
The co-ordinates for Aurangabad are N 19° 53' 47" – E 75° 23' 54". The city is surrounded by the Ajanta mountain range in all directions.

=== Climate ===
Aurangabad features a semiarid climate under the Köppen climate classification. Annual mean temperatures range from 17 to 33 °C, with the most comfortable time to visit being in winter – October to February. The highest maximum temperature ever recorded was 46 °C (115 °F) on 25 May 1905. The lowest recorded temperature was 2 °C (36 °F) on 2 February 1911. In the cold season, the district is sometimes affected by cold waves in association with the eastward passage of western disturbances across north India, when the minimum temperature may drop down to about 2 to 4 °C (36 to 39 °F).

Most of the rainfall occurs in the monsoon season from June to September. Thunderstorms occur between November and April. Average annual rainfall is 710 mm. The city is often cloudy during the monsoon season and the cloud cover may persist for days. The daily maximum temperature in the city often drops to around 22 °C due to the cloud cover and heavy rains.

Climate data for Aurangabad (Aurangabad Airport) 1991–2020, extremes 1952–2012
Month	Jan	Feb	Mar	Apr	May	Jun	Jul	Aug	Sep	Oct	Nov	Dec	Year
Record high °C (°F)	34.2 (93.6)	37.8 (100.0)	40.6 (105.1)	43.6 (110.5)	43.8 (110.8)	43.0 (109.4)	37.1 (98.8)	35.6 (96.1)	37.0 (98.6)	37.6 (99.7)	34.6 (94.3)	33.6 (92.5)	43.6 (110.5)
Mean daily maximum °C (°F)	29.2 (84.6)	31.8 (89.2)	35.6 (96.1)	38.7 (101.7)	39.6 (103.3)	34.6 (94.3)	30.1 (86.2)	29.2 (84.6)	30.2 (86.4)	31.8 (89.2)	30.5 (86.9)	29.1 (84.4)	32.5 (90.5)
Daily mean °C (°F)	21.0 (69.8)	23.8 (74.8)	27.9 (82.2)	31.5 (88.7)	32.7 (90.9)	28.8 (83.8)	26.0 (78.8)	25.3 (77.5)	25.8 (78.4)	25.6 (78.1)	23.3 (73.9)	20.9 (69.6)	26.1 (78.9)
Mean daily minimum °C (°F)	12.4 (54.3)	14.9 (58.8)	19.0 (66.2)	23.1 (73.6)	25.1 (77.2)	23.6 (74.5)	22.4 (72.3)	21.8 (71.2)	21.5 (70.7)	19.1 (66.4)	15.6 (60.1)	12.5 (54.5)	19.2 (66.6)
Record low °C (°F)	1.2 (34.2)	1.9 (35.4)	7.1 (44.8)	10.2 (50.4)	14.2 (57.6)	18.2 (64.8)	18.4 (65.1)	17.2 (63.0)	12.6 (54.7)	8.3 (46.9)	1.9 (35.4)	1.2 (34.2)	1.2 (34.2)
Average rainfall mm (inches)	2.6 (0.10)	2.2 (0.09)	11.4 (0.45)	6.0 (0.24)	17.4 (0.69)	155.6 (6.13)	178.0 (7.01)	171.5 (6.75)	172.4 (6.79)	68.2 (2.69)	17.5 (0.69)	8.9 (0.35)	811.7 (31.96)
Average rainy days	0.3	0.2	0.9	0.6	1.2	8.0	10.9	10.0	8.4	3.9	1.1	0.5	46.1
Average relative humidity (%) (at 17:30 IST)	40	35	28	27	29	55	71	73	69	53	49	44	48
Average ultraviolet index	6	7	8	8	8	7	6	6	7	6	6	6	7
Source 1: India Meteorological Department
Source 2: Weather Atlas, Tokyo Climate Center (mean temperatures 1991–2020)

Aurangabad has been ranked the 36th best "National Clean Air City" (under Category 1 >10L Population cities) in India.

=== Geology ===
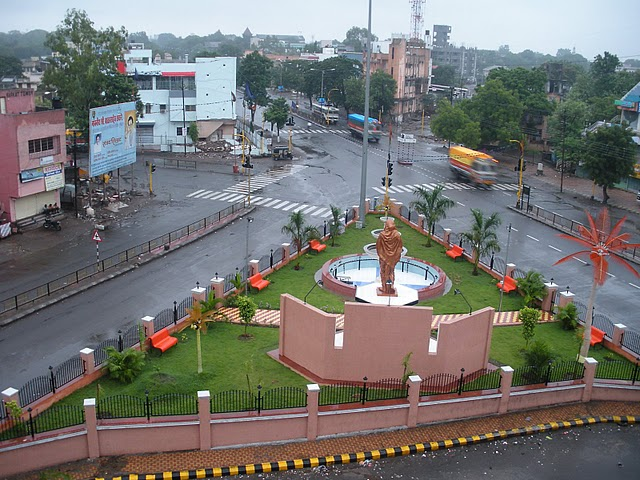
Ahilyabai Holkar Chauk, Station Road, Aurangabad

The entire area is covered by the Deccan Traps lava flows of the Upper Cretaceous to Lower Eocene ages. The lava flows are overlain by thin alluvial deposits along the Kham and Sukhana rivers. The basaltic lava flows are the only major geological formation in Aurangabad. The lava flows are horizontal, and each flow has two distinct units. The upper layers consist of vesiculara and amygdaloidal zeolitic basalt, while the bottom layer consists of massive basalt. The lava flows are individually different in their ability to receive as well as hold water in storage and to transmit it. The difference in the productivity of groundwater in various flows arises as a result of their inherent physical properties, such as porosity and permeability. The groundwater occurs under water table conditions and is mainly controlled by the extent of its secondary porosity, i.e. thickness of weathered rocks and spacing of joints and fractures. The highly weathered vesicular trap and underlying weathered jointed and fractured massive trap constitutes the main water-yielding zones. The soil is mostly formed from igneous rocks and is black, medium black, shallow and calcareous types having different depths and profiles.

== Demographics ==
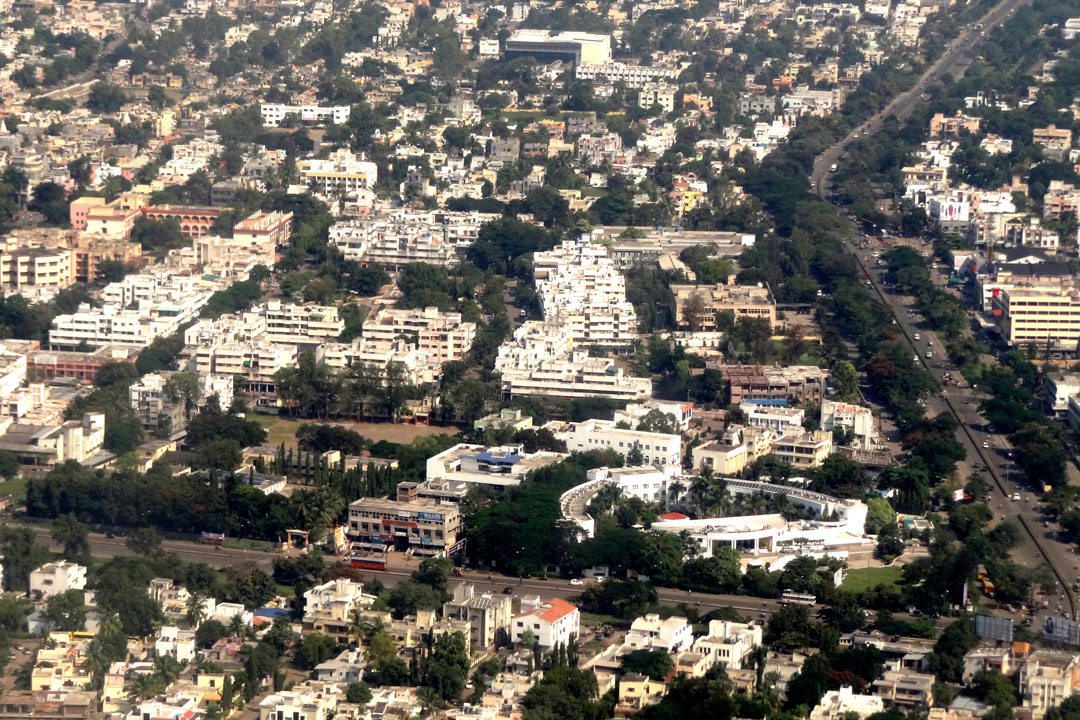
Aerial View of Aurangabad CIDCO

Historical population
Year	Pop.	±%
1901	10,000	—
1911	34,902	+249.0%
1921	36,876	+5.7%
1931	36,870	−0.0%
1941	50,924	+38.1%
1951	66,636	+30.9%
1961	97,701	+46.6%
1971	165,253	+69.1%
1981	301,000	+82.1%
1991	592,000	+96.7%
2001	902,179	+52.4%
2011	1,421,879	+57.6%
Source: Census of India

According to the 2011 Indian Census, Aurangabad had a population of 1,175,116, of which 609,206 were males and 565,910 were females. Of these, 158,779 were in the age range of 0 to 6 years. The total number of literate people in Aurangabad was 889,224, which constituted 75.67% of the population with male literacy of 79.34% and female literacy of 71.72%. The effective literacy rate of 7+ population of Aurangabad was 87.5%, of which male literacy rate was 92.2% and female literacy rate was 82.5%. The Scheduled Castes and Scheduled Tribes population was 229,223 and 15,240, respectively. There were 236659 households in Aurangabad in 2011.

=== Religion ===
Religions in Aurangabad City (2011)
Religion	Percent
Hinduism	51.07%
Islam	30.79%
Buddhism	15.17%
Jainism	1.62%
Christianity	0.85%
Other or not stated	0.50%

The majority of the population in Aurangabad are Hindu (51%), followed by Muslim (30%), Buddhist (15.2%) and Jain (1.6%). There are also a substantial number of adherents of Sikhism and Christianity in the city. Buddhists are of Navayana tradition, who are mostly scheduled castes.

=== Language ===
Language in Aurangabad M. Corp (2011)
1. Marathi (59.1%)
2. Urdu (23.4%)
3. Hindi (12.0%)
4. Marwari (1.72%)
5. Other (3.80%)

Marathi is the official language of the city. It is also the most commonly spoken language in the city, followed by Urdu and Hindi.

== Administration and politics ==
=== Local administration ===
The Aurangabad Municipal Corporation (AMC) is the local civic body. It is divided into six zones. The Municipal Council was established in 1936, and administers an area of about 54.5 km^{2}. It was elevated to the status of municipal corporation on 8 December 1982, simultaneously including eighteen peripheral villages, raising the total area under its jurisdiction to 138.5 km^{2}.

The city is divided in 115 electoral wards called Prabhag, and each ward is represented by a corporator elected by the people from each ward. There are two committees, the General Body and Standing Committee, headed by the mayor and the chairman, respectively. The AMC is responsible for providing basic amenities, such as drinking water, drainage facilities, roads, street lights, healthcare facilities, primary schools, etc. The AMC collects its revenue from urban taxes collected from its citizens. The administration is headed by the Municipal Commissioner; an IAS Officer, assisted by the other officers of different departments. The Aurangabad Metropolitan Region Development Authority (AMRDA) is being formed for the development of the region.

=== Municipal finance ===
According to financial data published on the CityFinance Portal of the Ministry of Housing and Urban Affairs, the Chhatrapati Sambhajinagar Municipal Corporation reported total revenue receipts of ₹758 crore (US$91 million) and total expenditure of ₹769 crore (US$93 million) in 2022–23. Tax revenue accounted for about 14.4% of the total revenue, while the corporation received ₹371 crore in grants during the financial year.

=== State and central administration ===
Aurangabad division is one of the six administrative divisions of Maharashtra state in India. Aurangabad division almost completely coincides with the Marathwada region of Maharashtra. Aurangabad has one seat in the Lok Sabha. In the 2024 general election, Shiv Sena candidate Sandipanrao Bhumre was elected as a member of parliament from Aurangabad.

Aurangabad also has three state assembly seats, Aurangabad East, Aurangabad Central and Aurangabad West, which are represented by Atul Moreshwar Save (BJP), Pradeep Jaiswal (Shiv-Sena) and Sanjay Shirsat (Shiv-Sena), respectively, since the 2019 Maharashtra Legislation Assembly election.

Himroo Shawl

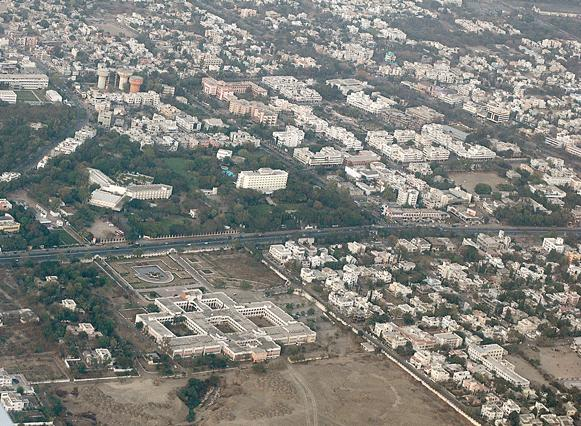
Bombay High Court Aurangabad Bench, ITC Welcomgroup's The Rama International, Ajanta Ambassador & Cidco Town Center – Aerial view

== Economy ==
Aurangabad is considered to be a classic example of efforts of state government towards balanced industrialisation of state. The city was a major silk and cotton textile production center. A fine blend of silk with locally grown cotton was developed as Himroo textile. Paithani silk saris are also made in Aurangabad. With the opening of the Hyderabad-Godavari Valley Railways in the year 1900 several ginning factories were started. After 1960, Maharashtra Industrial Development Corporation (MIDC) began acquiring land and setting up industrial estates. The Maharashtra Center For Entrepreneurship Development's main office is in Aurangabad. Major industries in Auragabad are manufacturing, biotechnology, pharmaceuticals and automobiles etc. In the 1990s, land near Shendra village on the Aurangabad-Jalna route was purchased. The MIDC created the Waluj and Chikalthana Industrial Areas as part of its efforts, which were quickly purchased.

Aurangabad is surrounded by the industrial areas (MIDCs) of Chikhalthana, Shendra and Waluj MIDC. A new industrial belt namely Shendra - Bidkin Industrial Park is being developed under DMIC. Major Siemens and automotive companies such as BMW, Audi India, Skoda Auto, Bajaj Auto and Goodyear Tire and Rubber Company have there units in the city. One of the largest Russian Steel Company NLMK has set up plant in DMIC Shendra phase.

== Culture/Cityscape ==
=== Culture ===
The culture of Aurangabad city is heavily influenced by the culture of Hyderabad. The old city still retains the cultural flavour and charms of Muslim culture of Hyderabad. Its influence is reflected in the language and cuisine of the locals. Although Urdu is among the principal languages of the city, along with Marathi and Hindi, it is spoken in the Dakhni – Hyderabadi Urdu dialect.

- Wali Dakhni also known as Wali Aurangabadi (1667–1731 or 1743) was a classical poet of Urdu from Aurangabad. He was the first established poet to have composed in Urdu language. Prominent poets like Shah Hatem, Shah Abro, Mir Taqi Mir, Zauq and Sauda were among his admirers. Other prominent poets from Aurangabad include Siraj Aurangabadi, Azad Bilgrami and Sikandar Ali Wajd.
- Abul Ala Maududi one of the Muslim scholars (1903–1979) was born in Aurangabad, India. Syed Abul A'ala Maududi was born to Maulana Ahmad Hasan, a lawyer by profession. His father was "descended from the Chishti line of saints. He was also the founder of Jamaat-e-Islami, the Islamic revivalist party.

=== Tourist attractions ===
Aurangabad is a historical city along with its surrounding towns and villages.

==== Indian religions ====
===== Indian rock-cut architecture =====
Aurangabad Caves

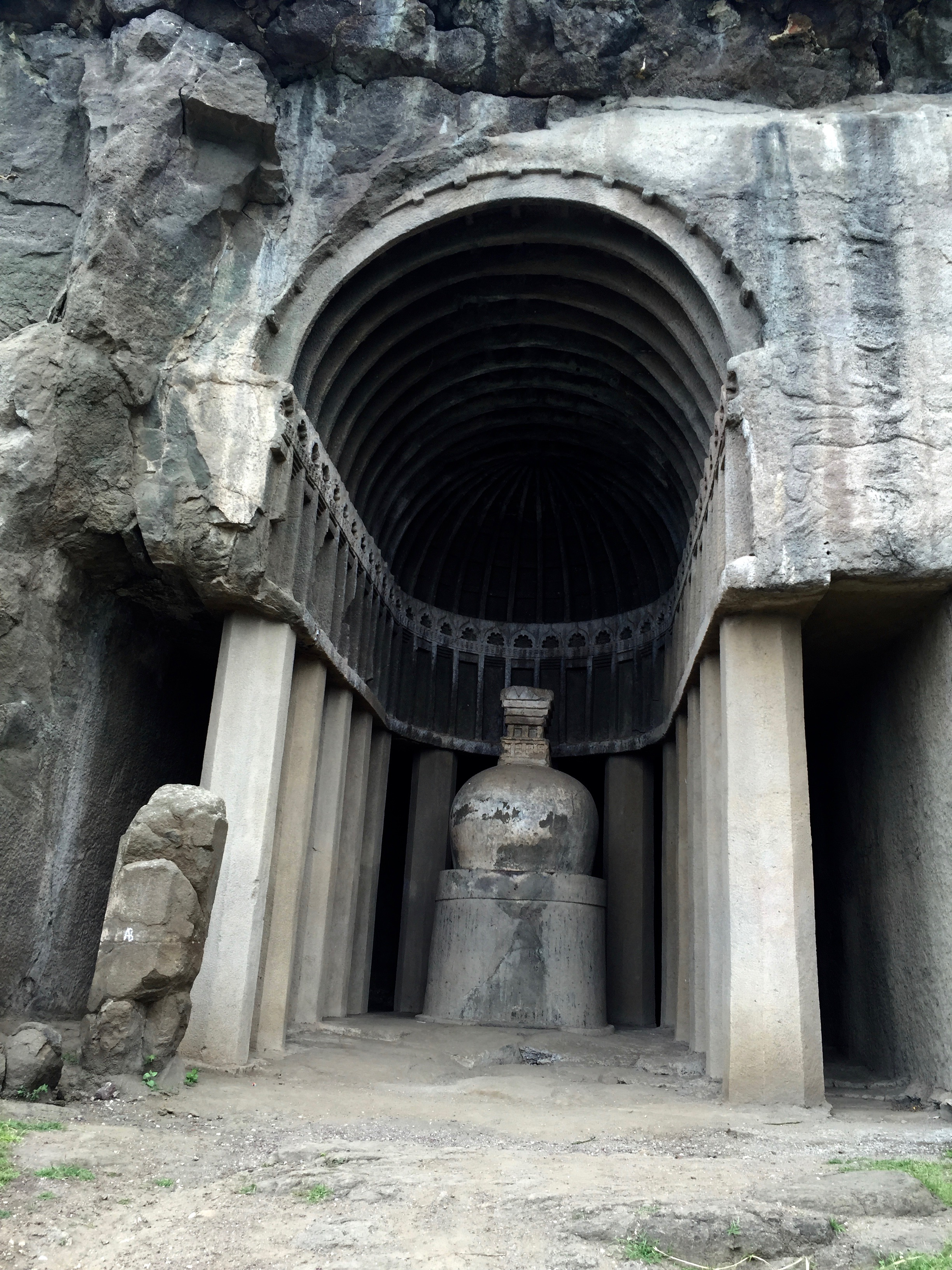
Chaitya with stupa, Cave IV (4), Aurangabad Caves.

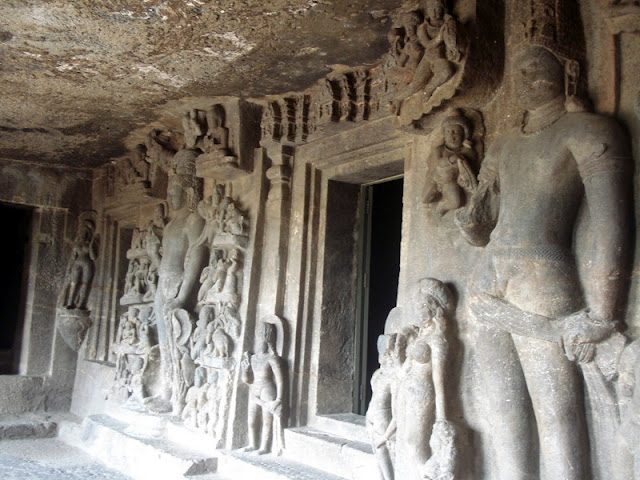
Various sculptors next to an entrance at Aurangabad Caves.
- Aurangabad Caves: These are situated at a distance of 5 km (3 mi), nestled amidst the hills are 12 Buddhist caves dating back to 3 A.D. Of particular interest are the Tantric influences evident in the iconography and architectural designs of the caves.

===== Hindu and Jain temples =====
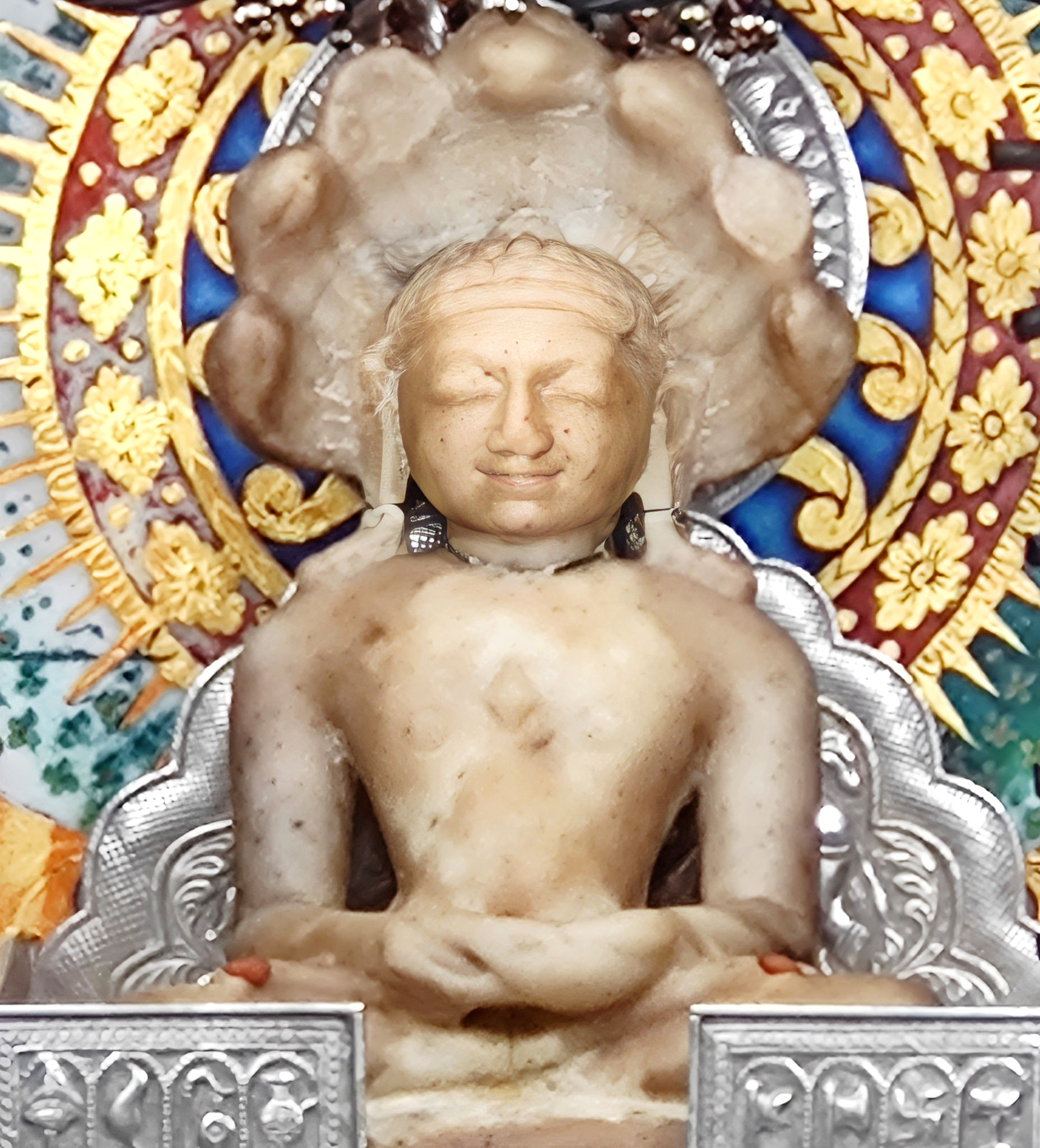
Chintamani Parshvanath idol at Kachner temple

- Kachner Jain Temple: This is a 250 years old temple dedicated to Parshvanath. The idol here is called Chintamani Parshvanath.

==== Gates and forts ====
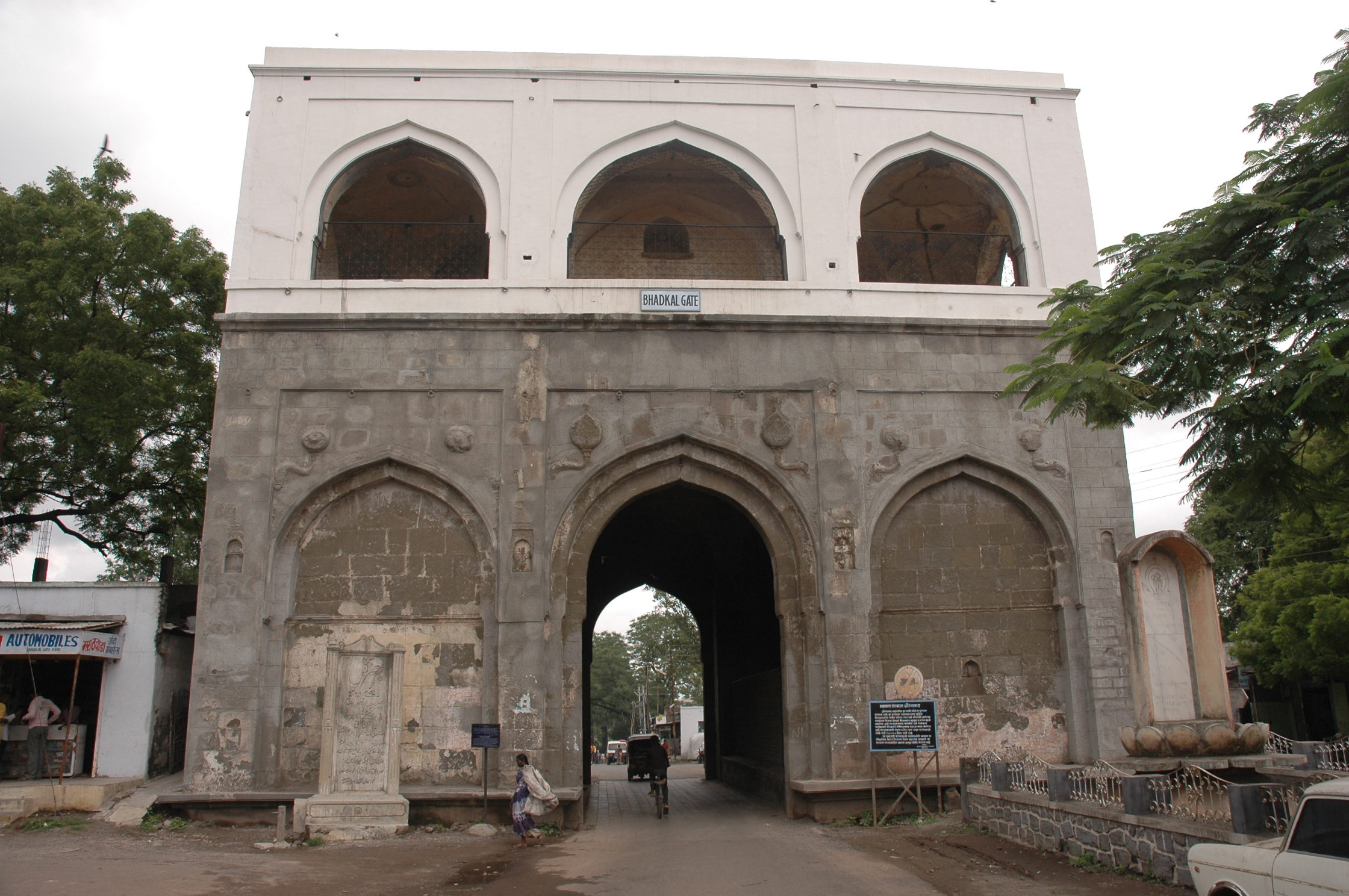
Bhadkal Gate, part of Gates in Aurangabad

- Gate: The city is also known for the 52 gates built during Mughal era which gives it the name of "City of Gates".

==== Mughal architecture ====
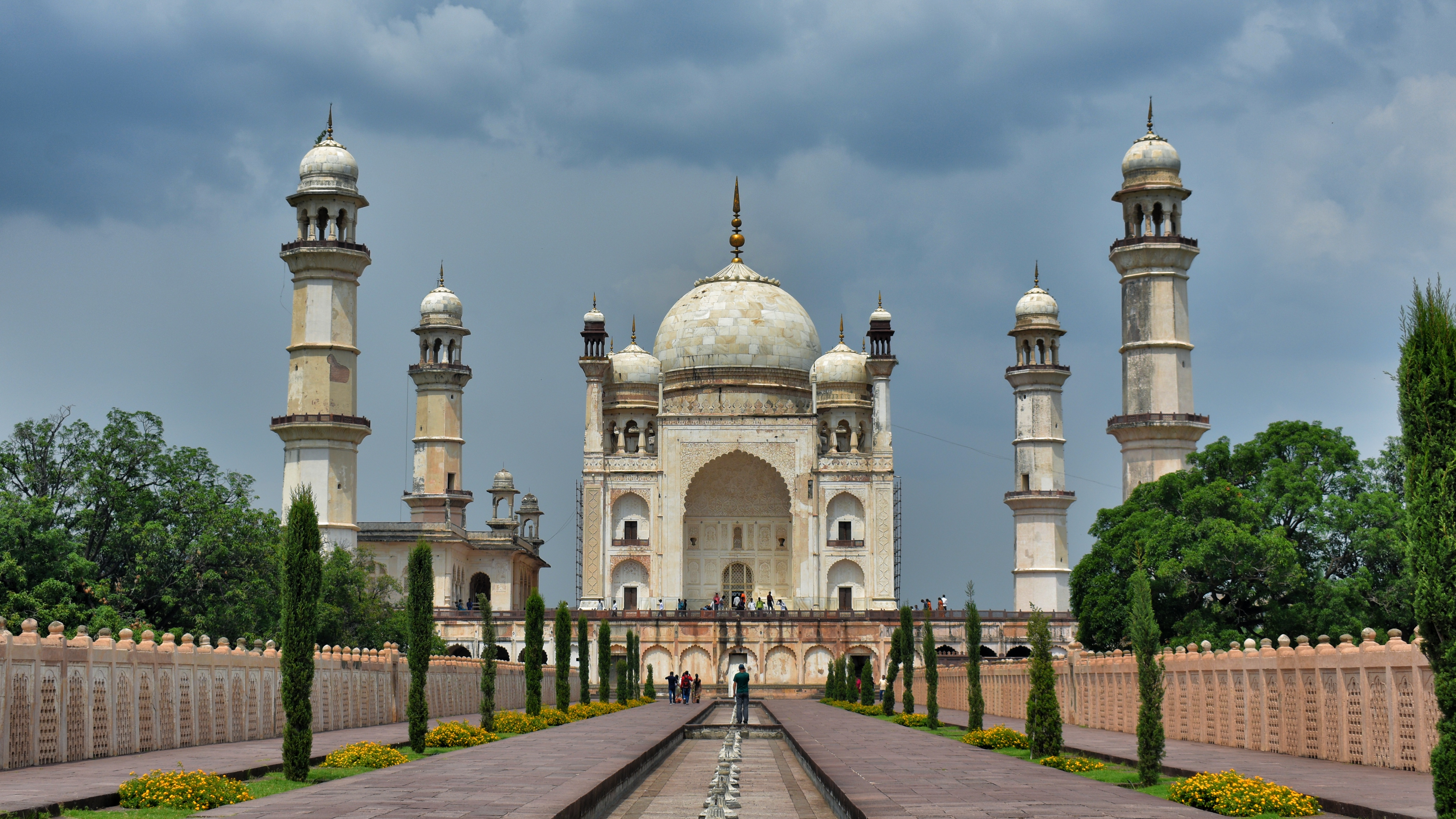
Bibi Ka Maqbara

- Bibi Ka Maqbara: Aurangabad is known for the Bibi Ka Maqbara situated about 3 km (2 mi) from the city, which is the burial mausoleum of Emperor Aurangzeb's wife Dilras Banu Begum, also known as Rabia-ud-Daurani. It is an imitation of the Taj Mahal at Agra and due to its similar design, it is popularly known as the "Taj of the Deccan". Aurangabad also has the remains of the palace built by Aurangzeb, including the royal mosque.

==== Other ====
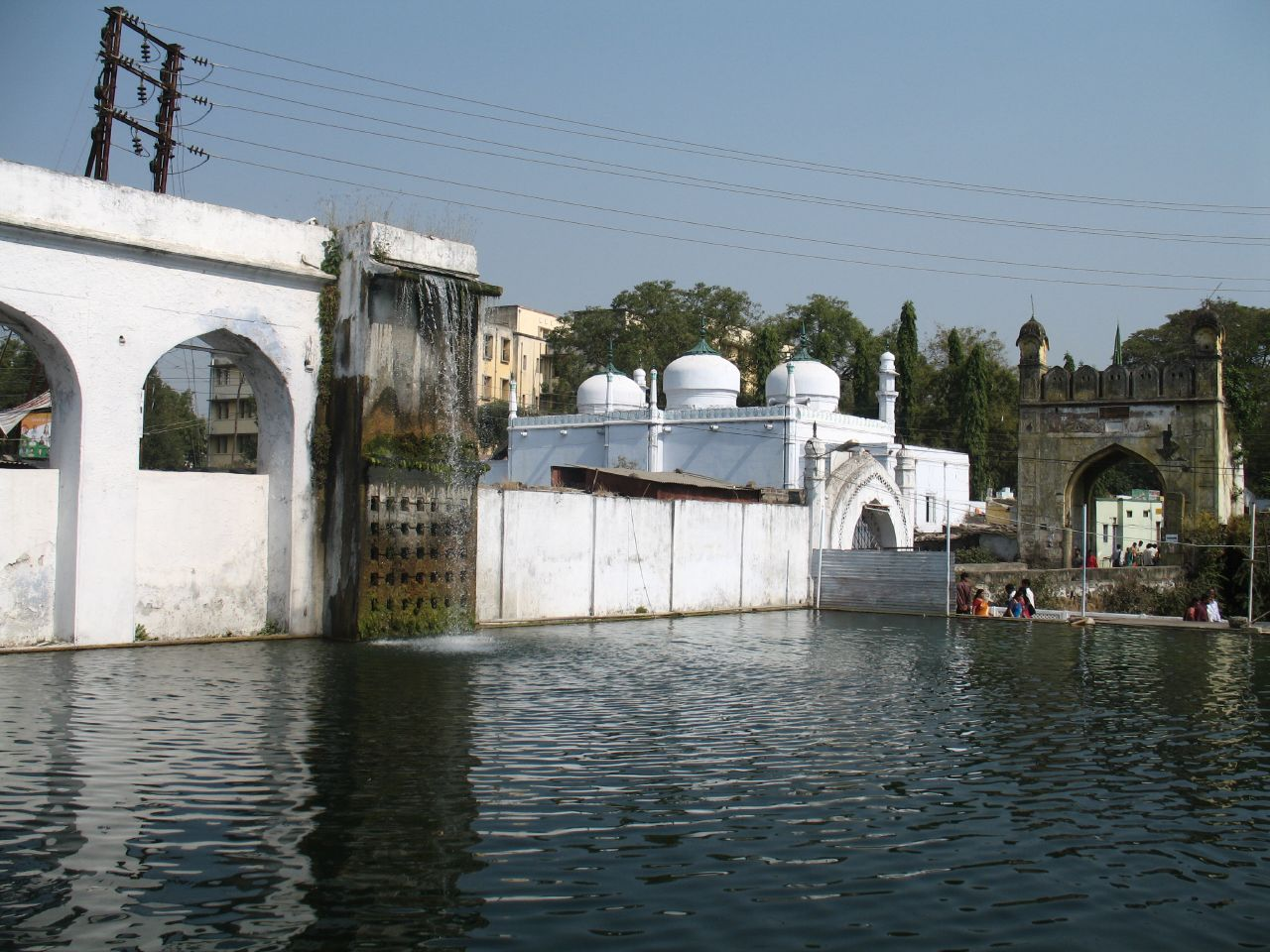
Panchakki, was designed to generate energy via water brought down from a spring on a mountain. It displays the scientific thought process put in medieval Indian architecture.

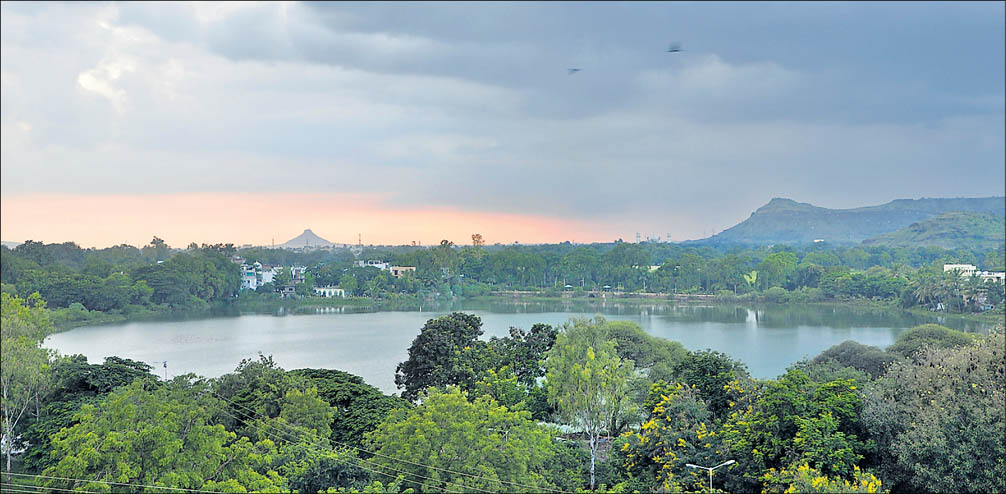
Salim Ali Lake

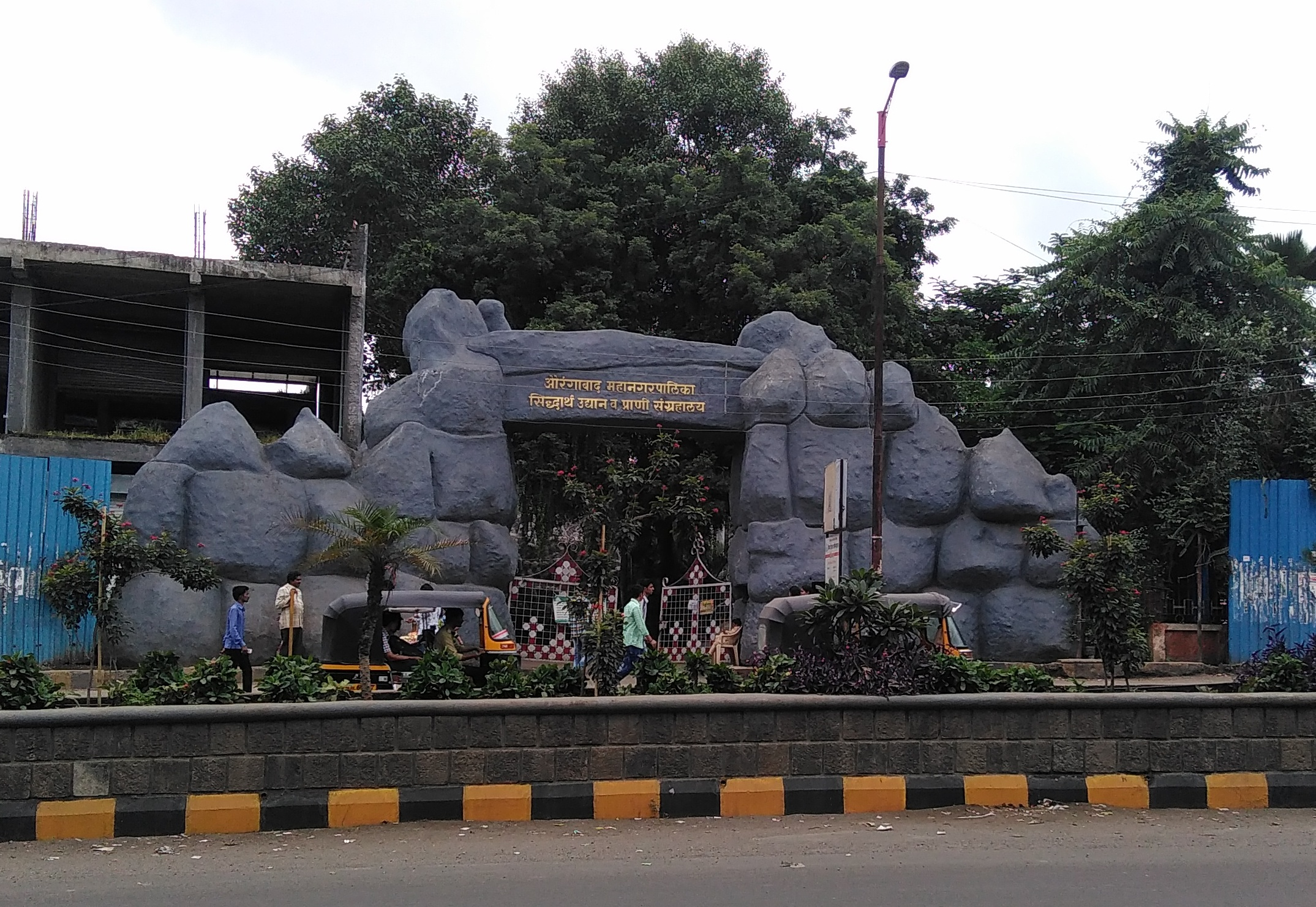
Siddharth Garden near bus stand Aurangabad
- Panchakki: Panchakki, which literally means water mill, is a 17th-century watermill situated within the old city is known for its underground water channel, which traverses more than 8 km from nearby hills. The channel culminates into an artificial waterfall that powers the mill.
- Salim Ali Lake & Bird Sanctuary: Popularly known as Salim Ali Talab (lake) is located in the northern part of the city near Delhi Darwaza, opposite Himayat Bagh. During the Mughal period, it was known as Khiziri Talab. It has been renamed after the great ornithologist and naturalist Salim Ali. It also has a bird Sanctuary and a garden maintained by the Aurangabad Municipal Corporation.
- Siddharth Garden and Zoo: is a park and zoo situated in near of the central bus station in Aurangabad. This is the only zoo in Marathwada region. There are various types of animals, birds, flowers and trees. The name of "Siddhartha" has been kept on the name of Gautama Buddha.

==== Mashru and Himroo ====
- Himroo: The fabric is said to have originated in Persia, though not conclusively proved, Himroo is associated with the times of Mohammad Tughlaq who ruled in the 14th century. Fabrics and shawls from Aurangabad are much in demand for their unique style and design.
- Kaghzipura: A place situated near Daulatabad made first handmade paper in India after the technology was brought here by Mongol invaders. However, the use of paper was not widespread there until the 12th century.

=== Cuisine ===
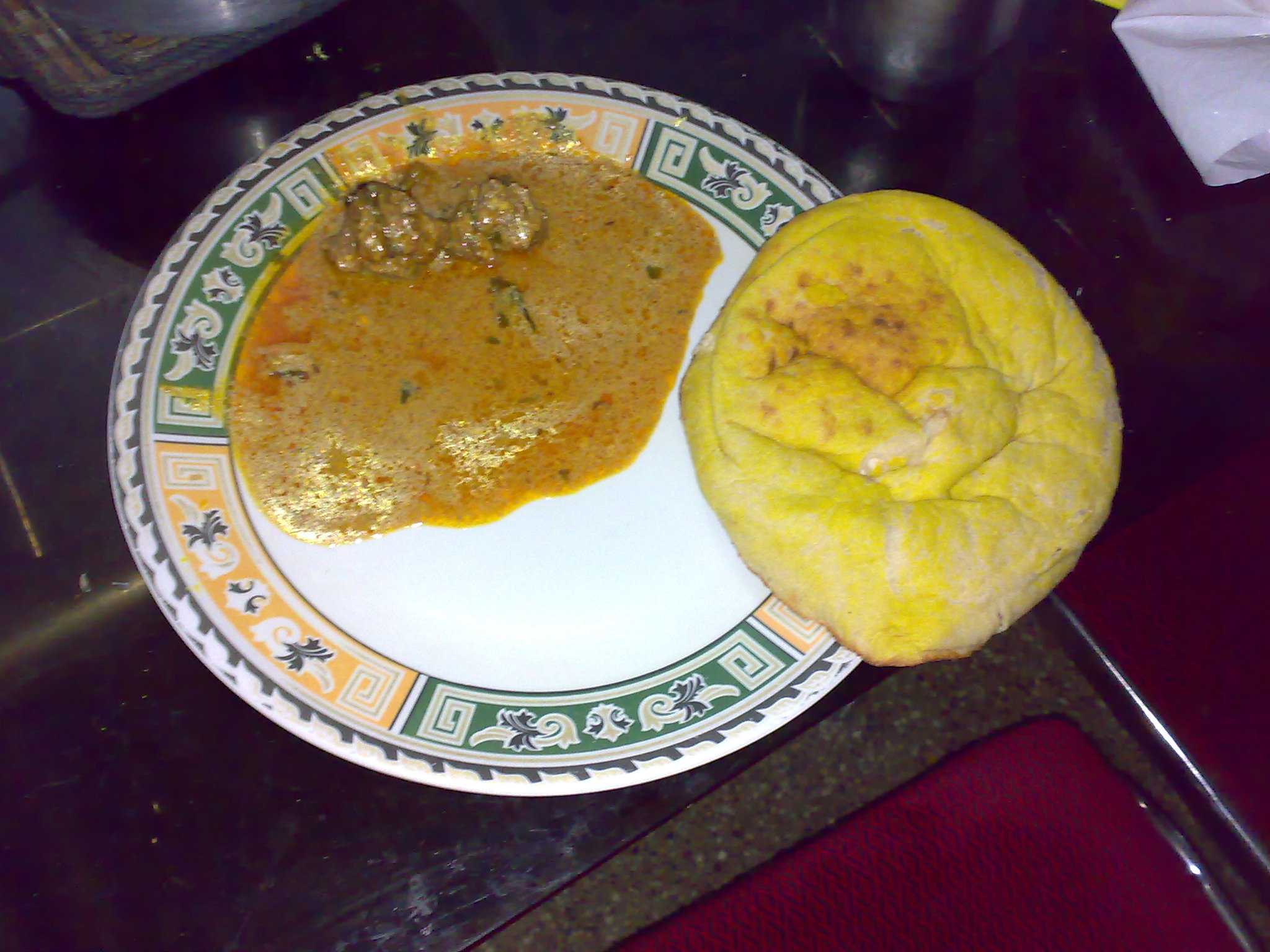
Naan Qaliya, Aurangabad

Aurangabadi food is much like Mughlai or Hyderabadi cuisine with its fragrant pulao and biryani. Meat cooked in fresh spices and herbs is a speciality, as are the delectable sweets. The local cuisine is a blend of Mughlai and Hyderabadi cuisine, with an influence of the spices and herbs of the Marathwada region.

- Naan Qalia is a dish that is associated with Aurangabad in India. It is a concoction of mutton and a variety of spices. Naan is the bread made in tandoor (Hot furnace) while Qalia is a mixture of mutton and various spices.
- Aurangabad/Marathwada/Dakhni cuisine is a blend of the Puneri and the Hyderabadi cuisine (which blends the use of typical South Indian ingredients such as curry leaves, tamarind and coconut into their celebrated culinary practices).

== Transport ==
=== Air ===
Aurangabad Airport is an airport serving the city and has connecting flights to Hyderabad, Delhi, Mumbai, Bangalore, Ahmedabad, Nagpur, Goa, Lucknow and Bangkok. In 2008, flights were made available to the people travelling to the Hajj pilgrimage.

=== Rail ===
Aurangabad railway station is the major railway station under Nanded railway division of the South Central Railway zone; it opened in 1900. It is located on the Kacheguda-Manmad section and has rail connectivity with major cities such as Delhi, Hyderabad, Latur Road, Manmad, Mumbai, Nagpur, Nanded, Nashik Road, Nizamabad and Pune. The work of DPR preparation is ongoing for metro in Aurangabad from Shendra and Waluj. The work of surveys and DPR is also ongoing for high speed rail line from Mumbai to Nagpur, which will have a halt in Aurangabad.

=== Road ===
Central Bus Stand and CIDCO bus stand, Aurangabad of MSRTC are the main public transport centres. Buses are available to every major bus depots of Maharashtra. Ola Cabs service is available in city. Major long route Aurangabad buses reach Delhi, Jaipur, Gandhinagar and Hyderabad in 2–3 days. MSRTC buses are also available for all district of Maharashtra and neighbouring State's cities like Indore, Ujjain, Surat, Vadodara, Khandwa, Burhanpur, Khargone, Bhopal. There are Smart City Bus service in Aurangabad as the part of public transport in Aurangabad Metro City.

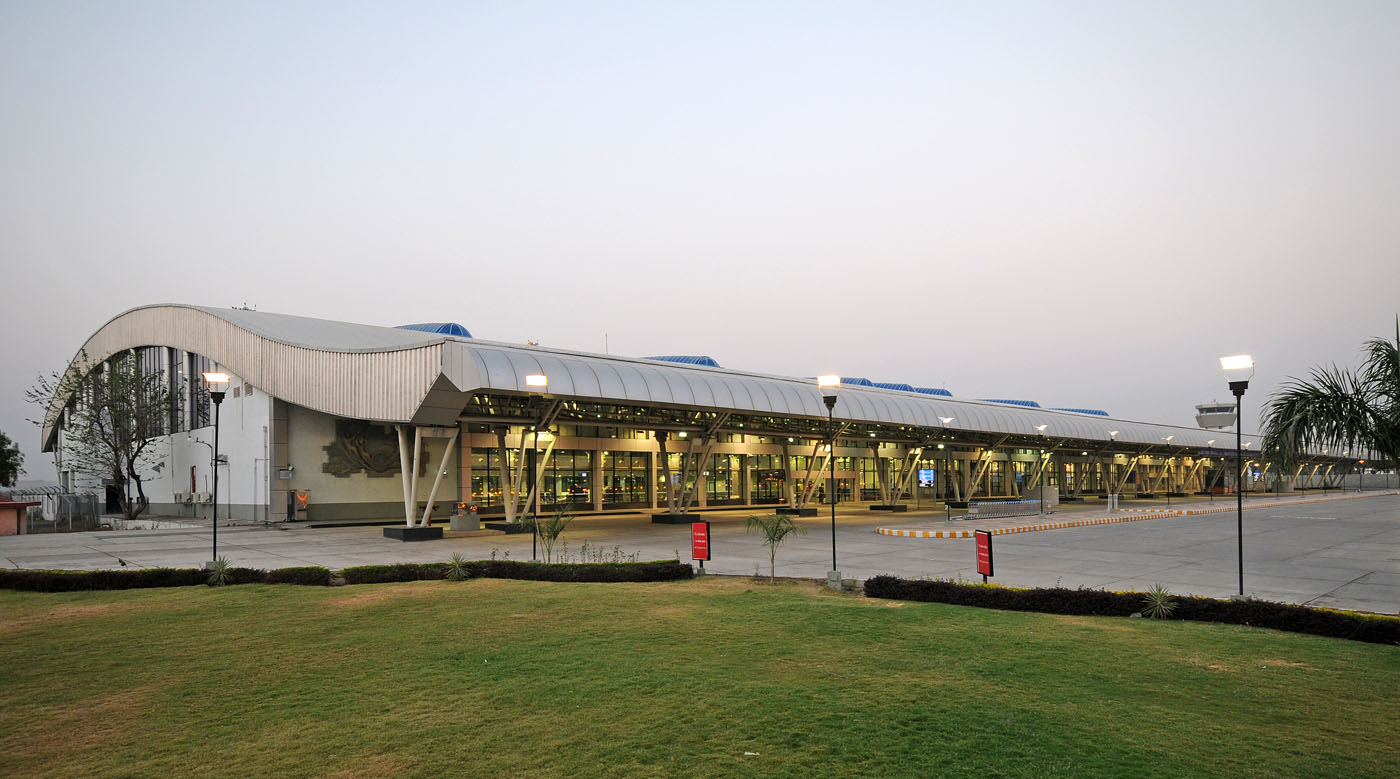
Aurangabad Airport

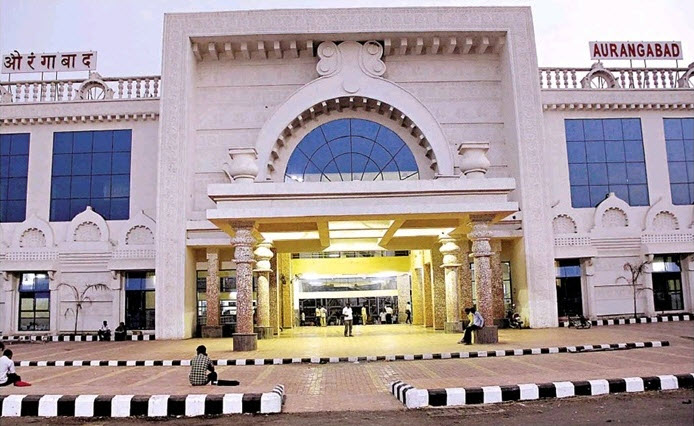
Aurangabad Railway Station

== Education ==
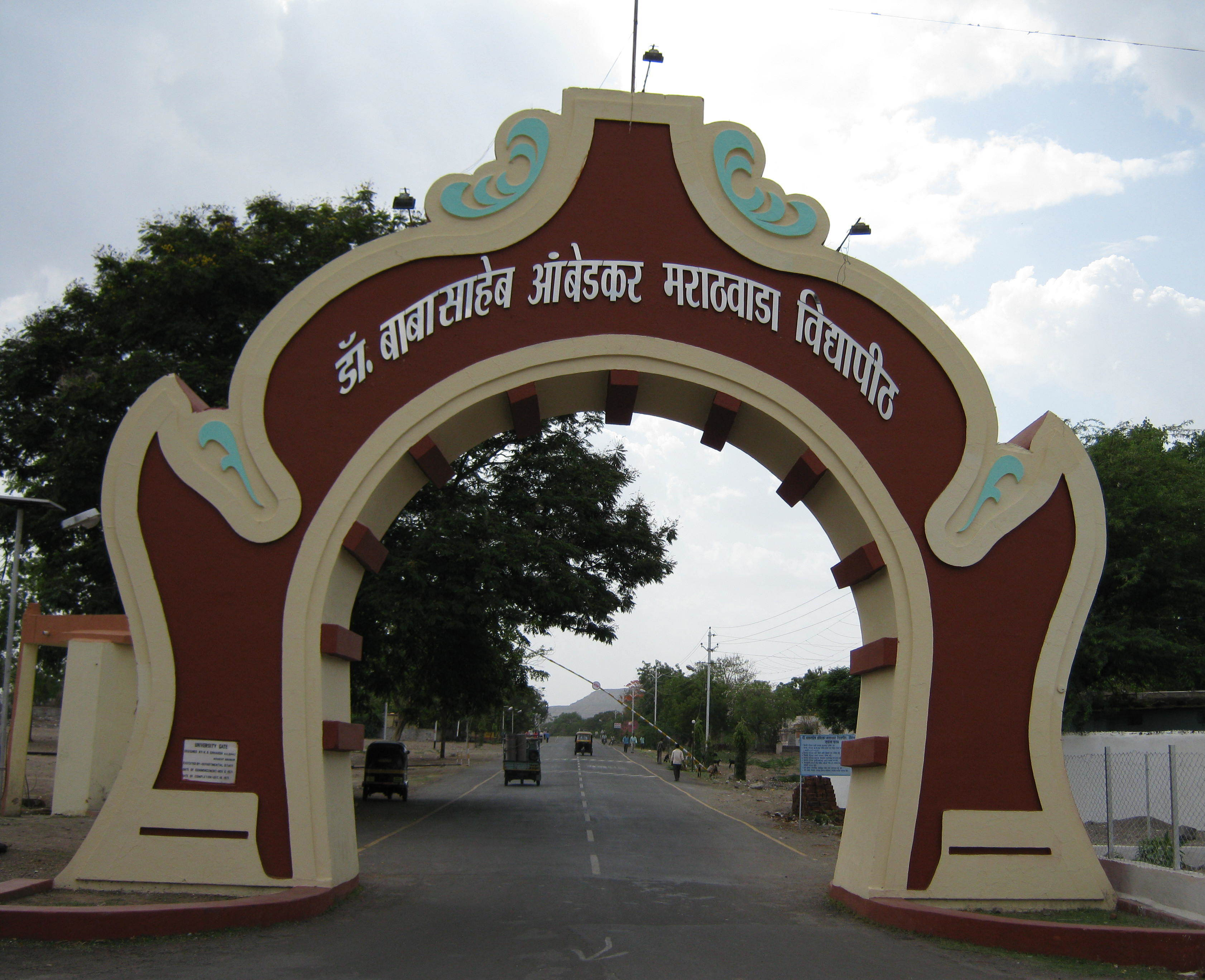
Dr. Babasaheb Ambedkar Marathwada University gate

Dr. Babasaheb Ambedkar Marathwada University (BAMU) is located in Aurangabad city. Many colleges in the region are affiliated to it. The university has 101 affiliated colleges in Aurangabad.

Government College of Engineering, Aurangabad is an autonomous engineering college. It was affiliated with the Dr. Babasaheb Ambedkar Marathwada University and was established in 1960. The construction of the college was started in 1957 and completed in 1960. Marathwada Institute of Technology and Jawaharlal Nehru Engineering College are two other engineering colleges in Aurangabad.

Maharashtra National Law University, Aurangabad is a state university located in Aurangabad. It was established in 2017 by the Government of Maharashtra, the third and final university to be installed through the Maharashtra National Law University Act, 2014.

Maulana Azad College of Arts and Science was founded in 1963 by Rafiq Zakaria, who formed a trust called Maulana Azad Education Society to manage its affairs. The college is affiliated with Dr. Babasaheb Ambedkar Marathwada University of Aurangabad.

The National Institute of Electronics & Information Technology Aurangabad (NIELIT Aurangabad) is located on the Dr. B.A.M. University campus. It is a central government engineering institute under the Ministry of Communication & Information Technology Government of India.

Aurangabad has schools run by the Aurangabad Municipal Corporation (AMC) and private schools owned and run by trusts and individuals. Government Polytechnic Aurangabad and CSMSS College of Polytechnic are among the polytechnic institutions in Marathwada region.

The Institute of Hotel Management, Aurangabad, is affiliated with University of Huddersfield. Students have internships in the Vivanta, Taj in Aurangabad.

== Sports ==
Garware Stadium is the municipal stadium in the city. International-standard cricket stadium at Aurangabad District Cricket Association Stadium is under construction. Jawaharlal Nehru Engineering College Sports Complex is a sports complex with in Jawaharlal Nehru Engineering College mainly used by college sports event.

== Notable people ==
- Malik Ambar, a Siddi military leader and founder of Khadki (former name of city)
- Siraj Aurangabadi, 18th-century Indian Urdu and Persian poet
- Prashant Bamb, MLA from the Gangapur constituency, member of the Bharatiya Janata Party
- Ankit Bawne, cricketer
- Sandipanrao Bhumre, MLA from Paithan constituency, member of Shiv Sena
- Rajendra Darda, former MLA from Aurangabad East constituency, member of the Indian National Congress
- Tarang Jain, businessman
- Imtiyaz Jaleel, Indian politician and member of the All India Majlis-e-Ittehadul Muslimeen
- Mayuri Kango, film actress
- Chandrakant Khaire, Indian politician and member of Shiv Sena
- Aurangabadi Mahal, wife of Mughal emperor Aurangzeb
- Abul A'la Maududi, Pakistani theologian and philosopher of Islam
- Yashraj Mukhate, musician
- Bashar Nawaz, Indian Urdu poet and lyricist
- Dulari Qureshi, art historian
- Samir Shah, Television executive
- Iqbal Siddiqui, cricketer
- Nikki Tamboli, film actress
- Vineet Verma, film director
- Wali Mohammed Wali, father of Urdu poetry
- Rafiq Zakaria, Indian politician

== See also ==
- List of twin towns and sister cities in India
- Bombay High Court
- Shirdi
- Pedavadlapudi
- Largest Indian Cities by GDP
