= Marathwada Institute of Technology =

Indian private engineering college

Maharashtra Institute of Technology (Autonomous)
- Motto: Nurturing Growth, Shaping the Future
- Type: Private
- Established: 1975
- Parent institution: Gramaudyogik Shikshan Mandal
- Affiliations: AICTE, COA
- Academic affiliations: Dr. Babasaheb Ambedkar Marathwada University
- Principal: Dr. Nilesh Patil
- Location: Chhatrapati Sambhajinagar, Maharashtra, India
- Website: engg.mit.asia

Marathwada Institute of Technology (MIT), is a private engineering college located in Aurangabad, Maharashtra, India. It is one of the technical institutes of Gramodyogik Shikshan Mandal (GSM).

== History ==
The parent trust, Gramaudyogik Shikshan Mandal (GSM), was established in 1975.

== Academics ==
MIT provides both undergraduate, postgraduate and doctorate programs for Indian and International students. Admission to the undergraduate courses is through the Maharashtra-Common Entrance Test for state-allocated seats (65%) and through the Joint Entrance Examination (JEE) for all-India seats.

The college is affiliated to Dr. Babasaheb Ambedkar Technological University (BATU). The engineering courses are approved by the All India Council for Technical Education (AICTE) and the architecture courses are approved by the Council of Architecture (COA). The institute is National Assessment and Accreditation Council (NAAC) accredited, with a grade of B+.

=== Ranking ===
Marathwada Institute of Technology was ranked 98 in Outlook India's "Top 100 Engineering Colleges in 2018".

== Organization and administration ==
At the institutional level, MIT is governed by a board of governors headed by a president and a director general. The board includes nominees from the GSM trust and members having specialized knowledge or practical experience in education, engineering or science.

For all academic matters, the academic advisory body is the authority having control and responsibility for the maintenance of standards of education and consists of reputed technologists or industrialists from the field of science and engineering.

The key people in the day-to-day operation of the institute are the principal and vice principal, assisted by heads of departments and a student council. The administration is managed by the registrar and administrative office

== Campus ==
The foundation stone of MIT building was laid by Late Anandraoji Deshmukh in 1975. The Central library is spread over 1500 sq.metres area. There are separate Hostels for boys and girls. There are also sports facilities like a spacious playground for games and recreation.
