= Ministry of Information Technology =

Ministry of Information Technology may refer to:

- Ministry of Information Technology and Telecommunication, cabinet level ministry of the Pakistan
- Ministry of Electronics and Information Technology (India)
- Ministry of Communications and Information Technology (India)
- Ministry of Information Technology (Maharashtra)
- Ministry of Information Technology (West Bengal), India
