= Market if touched =

In financial markets, market if touched or MIT is a type of order that will be executed when the price is touched (when a predetermined value has been reached and the futures contract will trade or bid at the price).

This type of order triggers a market order only when the security reaches a specified sell price. Stock buyers can place an MIT order to buy or to sell.

== See also ==
- Limit order
- Trading halt
- Correlation trading
