= Jama Mosque, Aurangabad =

Mosque in Aurangabad, Maharashtra, India

Jama Mosque
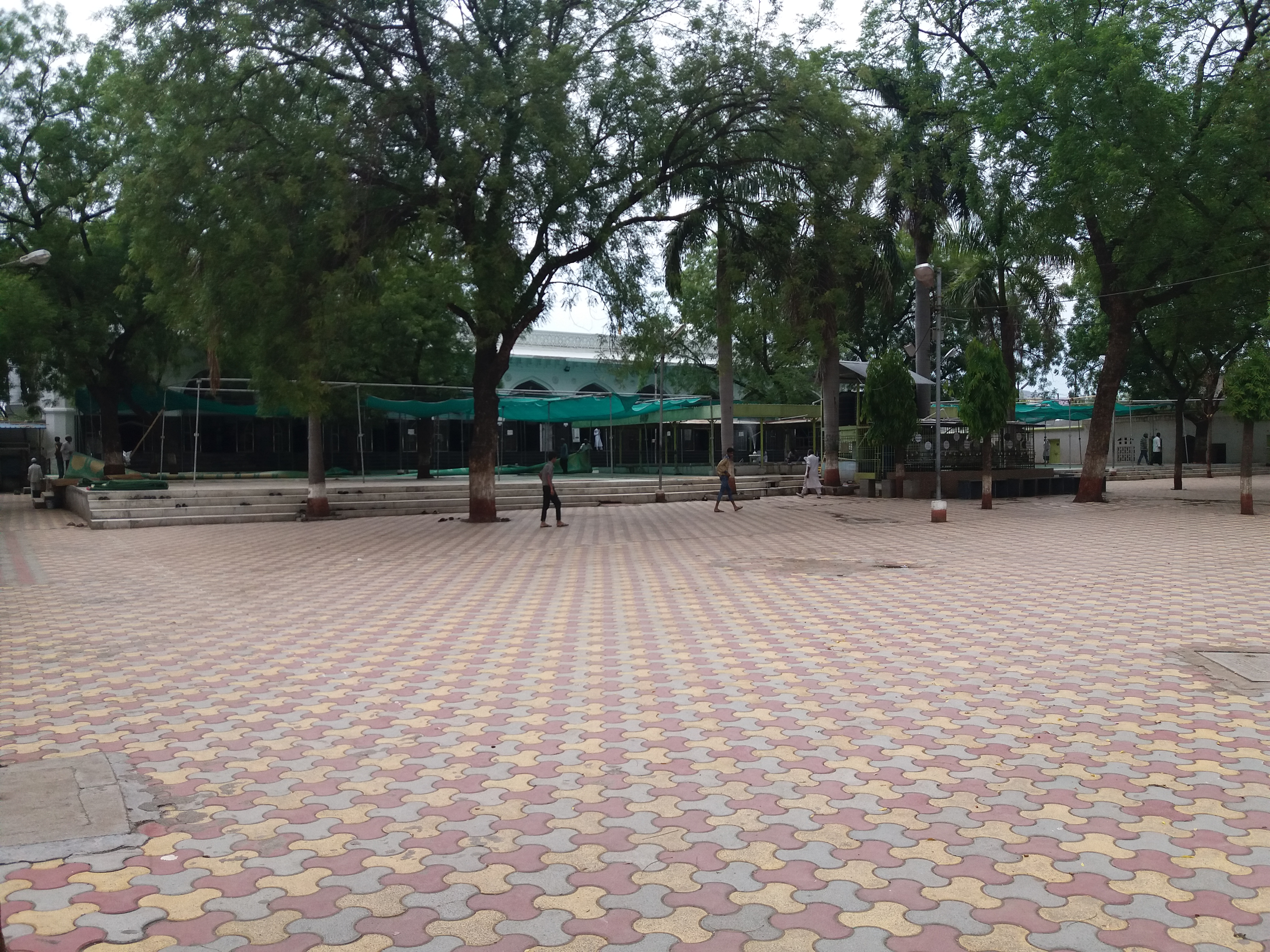
- Partially obscured mosque, in 2017

- Location of the mosque in Maharashtra

Religion
- Affiliation: Islam
- Ecclesiastical or organizational status: Friday mosque
- Status: Active

Location
- Location: Railway Station Road, Buddi lane, Naralibag, Aurangabad, Maharashtra
- Country: India
- Interactive map of Jama Mosque
- Coordinates: 19°53′31″N 75°19′34″E

Architecture
- Type: Mosque architecture
- Style: Indo-Islamic
- Founder: Malik Amber
- Funded by: Aurangzeb (R.H) (1692)
- Completed: 1612 CE; 1692 CE (extensions)

The Jama Masjid is a Friday mosque, located near the Killa Arrak in Aurangabad, in the state of Maharashtra, India. Completed in 1612 CE and extended in 1692, the mosque is historically significant because it was constructed very soon after the foundation of Aurangabad (then called "Fatehpur") by Malik Amber in 1610. It is one of the oldest mosques of Aurangabad in good condition.

== History ==
The mosque was constructed by Malik Amber in 1612 CE, once he found the city Kharaki in 1610 CE. When Amber died in 1626, he was succeeded by Fateh Khan, his son, who changed the name of Khadki to "Fatehnagar".

When Mughals captured Daulatabad in 1633, the Nizam Shahi dominions, including Fatehnagar, fell under the possession of the Mughals. In 1653, when Prince Aurangzeb was appointed the viceroy of the Deccan for the second time, he made Fatehnagar his capital and called it Aurangabad and built the fort Killa Arrak near the mosque, upon which the mosque felt in the boundaries of the fort walls expanding from Delhi Gate to Mecca Gate. Realising the architectural values of the mosque, Aurangzeb extended the mosque by constructing four arches in the front portion in 1692. As of 2011, among the magnificent fort, Amkhar (Public Hall) and Jama Masjid are the only structures in good condition.

== Architecture ==
The mosque is located near the Killa Arrak of Aurangabad. Out of the nine pointed arches in the front, five were erected by Malik Ambar.

== Gallery ==
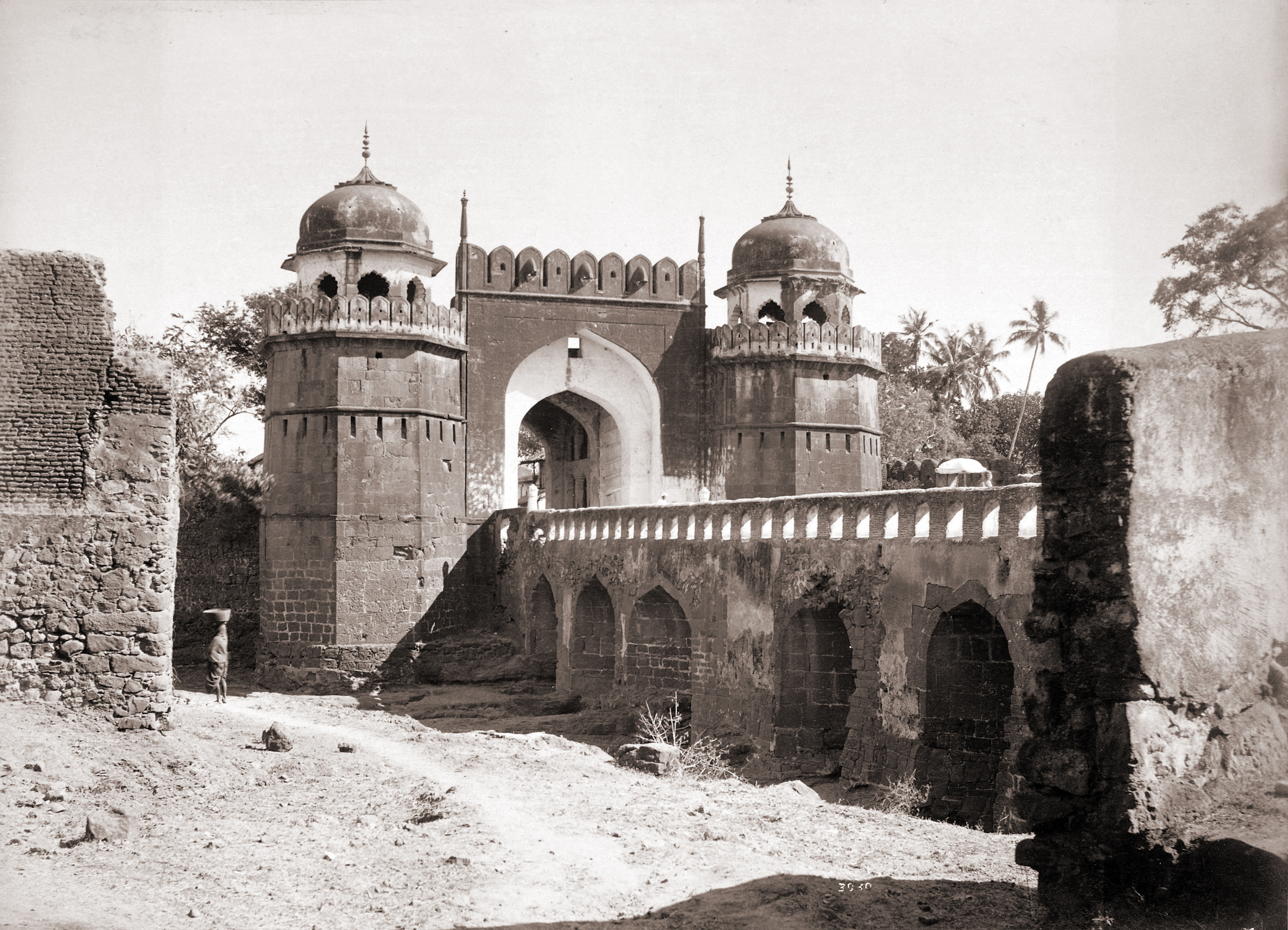
Mecca Gate near the mosque, by Deen Dayal, c. 1880s

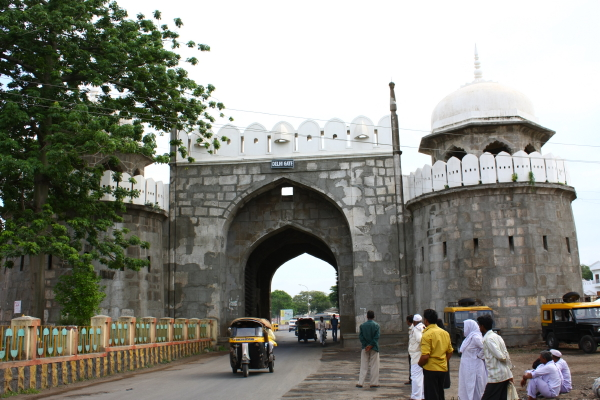
Early morning view of the Delhi Gate, near the mosque

== See also ==
- Islam in India
- List of mosques in India
- Tourist attractions in Aurangabad, Maharashtra
