= Zenana Mahal (Qila-e-Ark) =

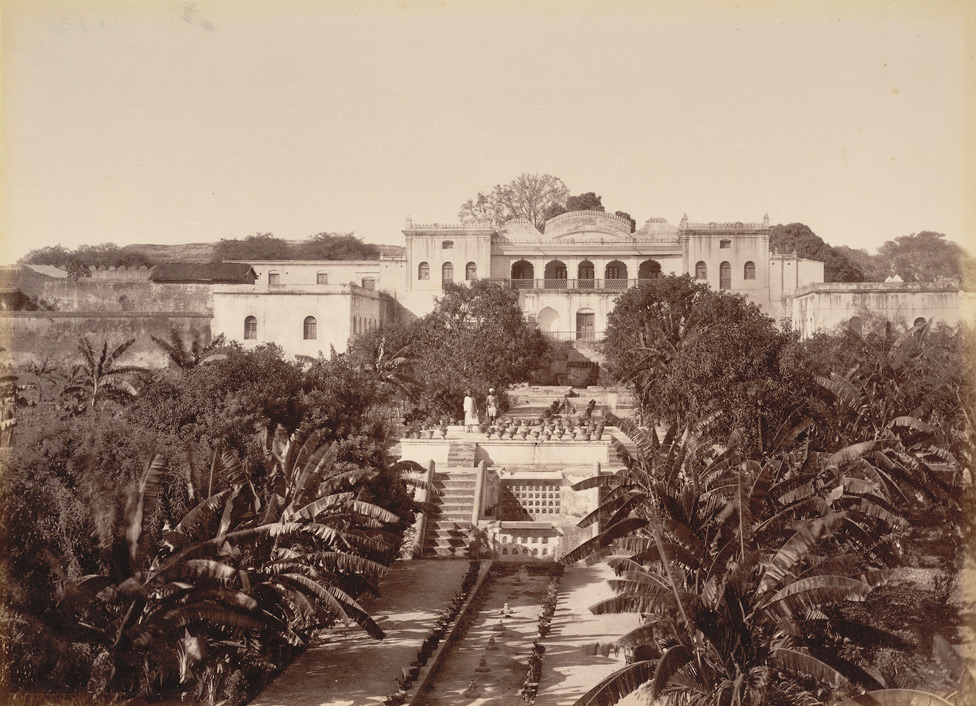
- Photograph of the palace taken in 1880.

General information
- Location: Aurangabad, (Chhatrapati Sambhajinagar) Maharashtra, India

The Zenana Mahal, also known as Zaibunissa Mahal, is a palace located inside the 17th-century Qila-e-Ark fort in Aurangabad. It served as the residence for the women of the harem and was the residence of Princess Zeb-un-Nissa.

== History ==
The palace was the principle residence of the ladies of the harem, and was built for them to live in when Aurangzeb was stationed in the Deccan. It is part of the Qila-e-Ark fort, which he had constructed in 1656. After he became emperor, he shifted to the Deccan in 1683 to oversee campaigns in the region, with Aurangabad serving as the capital. The chief consorts of Aurangzeb, such as Nawab Bai and Dilras Banu Begum lived here, and the princesses, notably Zeb-un-Nissa. She was a talented poet who wrote with the penname of Makhfi (the hidden one). She held significant influence in political affairs of the empire and Aurangzeb would listen to her opinions. Due to reasons speculated to be correspondence with her brother during the conflict of succession, she was imprisoned in the Salimgarh Fort, with her accumulated wealth confiscated and her annual pension of four lakh rupees nullified.

== Architecture ==
The palace has scalloped arches facing a garden with a tiered water canal and has a palatial terrace at the top storey. A large stairway leads into the front entrance, surrounded by overgrown shrubs and trees. The Zenana Mahal was one of the tallest buildings in the fort, overlooking the city. The roof has largely collapsed, with multiple doors and windows missing. In 1971, the palace was turned into the Government Arts College, which was later shifted to a separate building in 2004. The structure is largely dilapidated and stands in ruins, much like the rest of the fort, and was listed for restoration.
