= Alamgir Mosque, Aurangabad =

17th-century Mughal mosque in Maharashtra, India

Alamgir Mosque
- Location of the mosque in Maharashtra

Religion
- Affiliation: Islam
- Ecclesiastical or organisational status: Mosque
- Status: Active

Location
- Location: Qila Arq, Aurangabad, Maharashtra
- Country: India
- Coordinates: 19°53′45″N 75°19′58″E

Architecture
- Type: Mosque architecture
- Style: Mughal architecture
- Founder: Aurangzeb Alamgir
- Completed: 1693; 333 years ago
- Dome: Three

The Alamgir Mosque, now more commonly known as the Shahi Mosque, is a mosque located in Aurangabad, in the state of Maharashtra, India. It was built in 1693 by Mughal emperor Aurangzeb for his private use. It is one of the few surviving structures of the Qila-e-Ark, a fortified palace complex built as Aurangzeb's residence in Aurangabad, and is situated in its eastern flank.

== Overview ==
The structure was referred to as the Alamgiri Mosque as late as the twentieth century, and it is commonly known as the Shahi Mosque in the modern era.

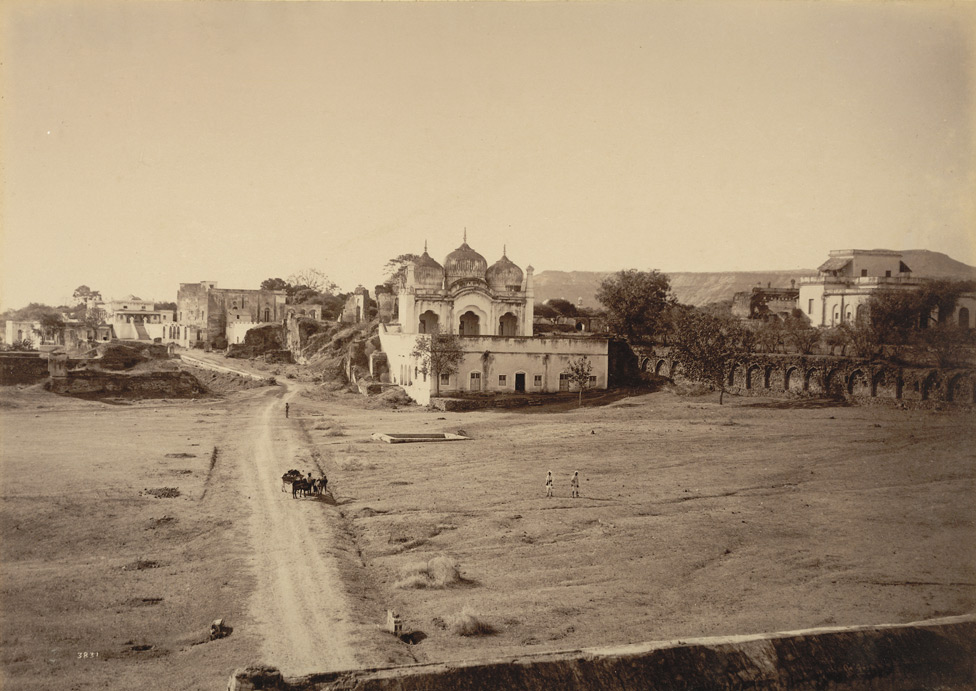
The mosque within the Qila-e-Ark site, c. 1880s, by Lala Deen Dayal

The mosque's prayer hall has a triple-vaulted roof, and features curved bangla cornices. It is topped by three fluted domes. The façade of the mosque bears three trilobed/trefoil arches. The Shahi Mosque's type and architecture find precedent in the Red Fort Moti Masjid, another private mosque built by the emperor in Delhi, which in turn draws from Shah Jahan-era mosques in Lahore and Agra. Michell and Zebrowski characterised the mosque's architecture as "unusual" in comparison to other Mughal mosques of Aurangabad, such as the Chauk Mosque or the Lal Mosque.

== See also ==
- Islam in India
- List of mosques in India
- Tourist attractions in Aurangabad, Maharashtra
