= Qila-e-Ark =

Coordinates: 19°53′19.63″N 75°20′36.37″E

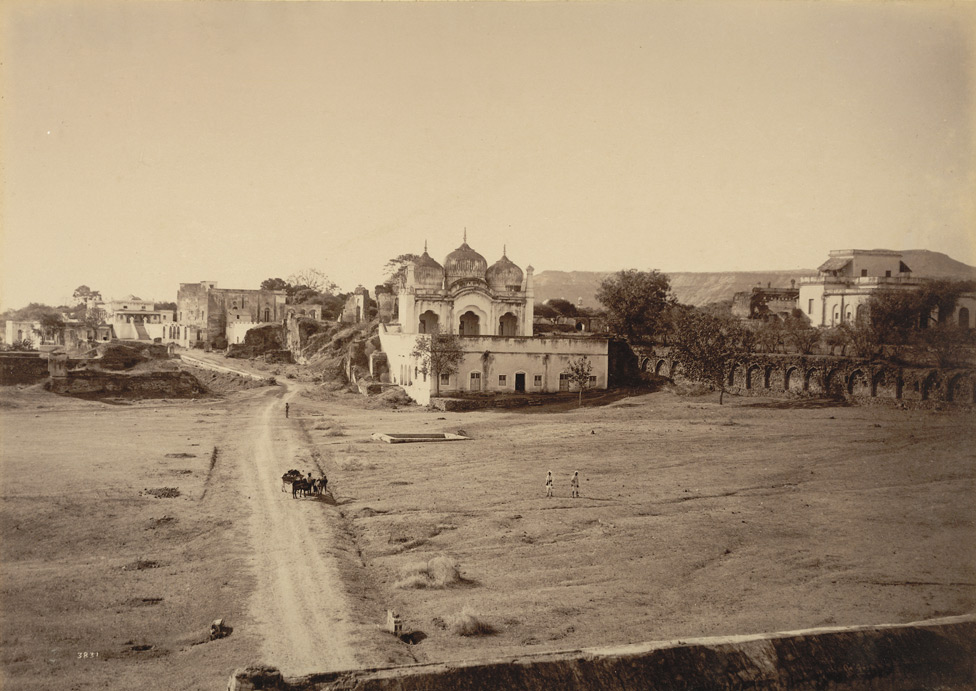
- View of the Alamgiri mosque within the Qila-e-Ark site, 1880s photograph by Lala Deen Dayal
- Interactive map of Qila-e-Ark
- Type: Palace fort
- Location: Aurangabad, Maharashtra

History
- Built: c. 1656
- Built for: Aurangzeb

Site notes
- Architectural style: Mughal
- Governing body: Denotified in 1971

Qila-e-Ark is a 17th-century palace/citadel complex in Aurangabad, Maharashtra. Built by the Mughal emperor Aurangzeb when he was a prince, it served as his royal residence during his subsequent reign as emperor. The site is currently ruined, and has no legal protected status; several modern-day buildings also on encroach the complex. Notable surviving structures include a royal mosque (today known as the Shahi mosque), and a palatial building.

== History ==
The Qila-e-Ark was constructed by Aurangzeb around 1656, during his second princely stint as governor of the Deccan (1653-1658). The palace was constructed on the northern edge of Aurangabad, Mughal capital of the Deccan, past an older palace complex called Qila Naukhanda (built by Malik Ambar of the Ahmadnagar Sultanate). In 1683, Aurangzeb (now emperor) permanently shifted to the Deccan to oversee campaigns in the region. The Qila-e-Ark served as the imperial residence when Aurangzeb was in Aurangabad, which acted as the de-facto capital of the empire during this period. The palace is an example of Aurangzeb's preference to build new palaces in the Deccan, rather than occupy pre-existing ones of the conquered Deccan Sultans. Scholar Pushkar Sohoni has used the palace to argue that Aurangzeb's patronage of architecture diminished with his age; Sohoni notes that the Qila-e-Ark dates to his time as a prince, but there is no comparable imperial residence dating to his actual reign as emperor.

The palace was used as a government college during the Nizam period; later the college was shifted. It was a notified monument of the state archaeology department, but was denotified in 1971.

Local organisations and experts have suggested that the palace be restored and be opened to the public, in order to revive the site as a tourist hub. Some organisations in Aurangabad conduct heritage walks in the Qila-e-Ark to spread awareness about the monument.

== Architecture ==
The fragmentary nature of the citadel complex has made its original structure and layout difficult to identify. Some gates associated with the palace site include Aurangabad's Naubat Darwaza, Makkai Darwaza, and the Dilli Darwaza. Michell & Zebrowsi consider the Naubat Darwaza to be the southern entrance portal. Sohoni theorises that the maximum extent of the palace complex may be marked by the Makkai Darwaza.

Very few of the palace-fort's original structures survive, as many have fallen into ruin or have been converted for use by modern institutions. One surviving monument is today known as the Shahi mosque, built by Aurangzeb in 1693 for his private use; this is situated in the eastern flank of the complex. The site also contains remnants of a terraced palace building, which Michell and Zebrowski describe as Aurangzeb's private pavilion. Its extant central chamber features a bangla-vaulted roof. The structure has been converted for use by Milind Arts College. Another structure of note is the remnants of a water channel and chadar (water ramp), found around the center of the terraces. The Qila-e-Ark once contained a Subahdari, a mansion used for hosting suboordinate officials.

== Gallery ==
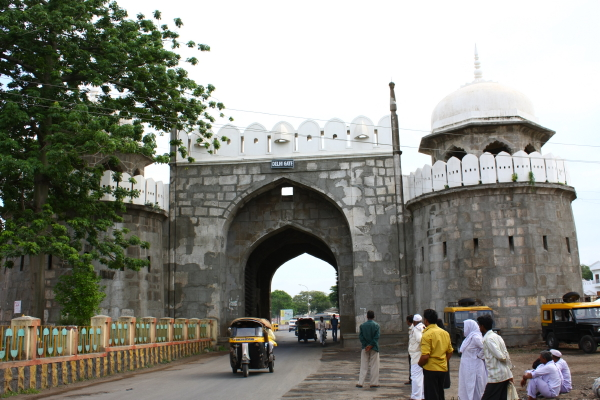
Delhi Gate, Aurangabad

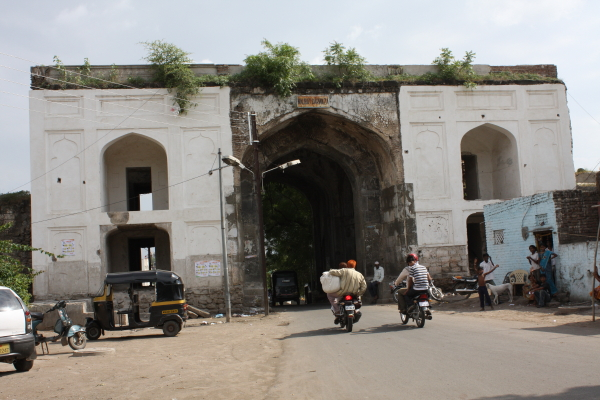
Naubat Gate, Aurangabad

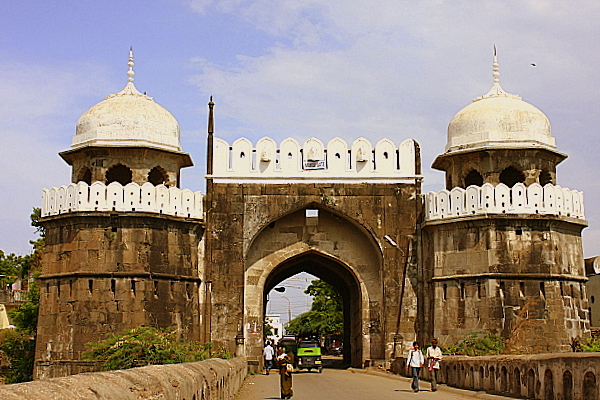
Makai Gate, Aurangabad

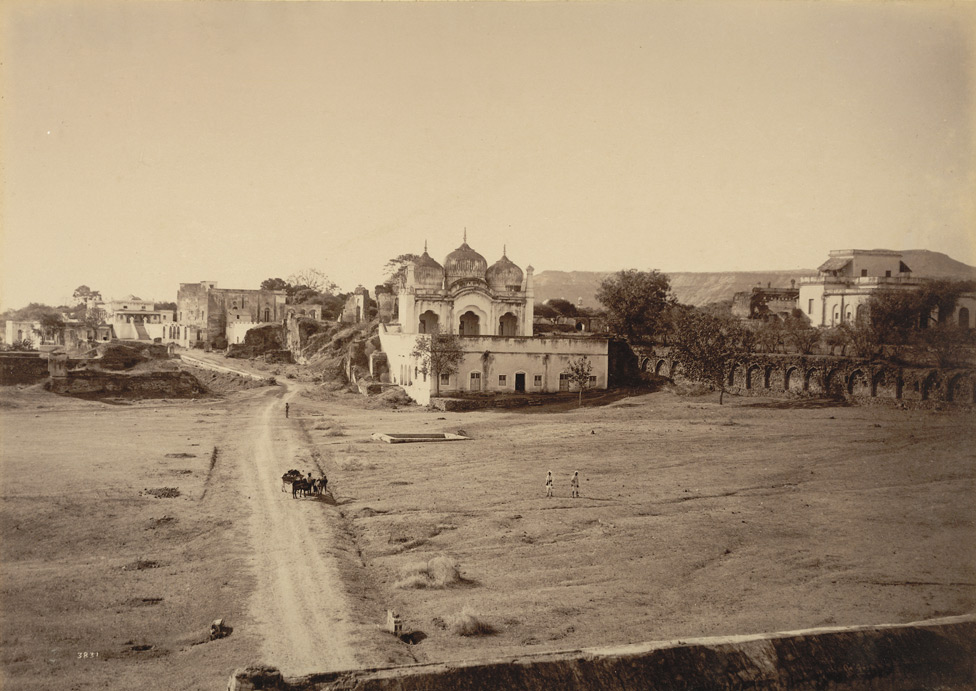
View of the Alamgiri mosque within the Qila-e-Ark site, 1880s photograph by Lala Deen Dayal
