= Burhan Nizam Shah III =

Sultan of Ahmadnagar from 1610 to 1631

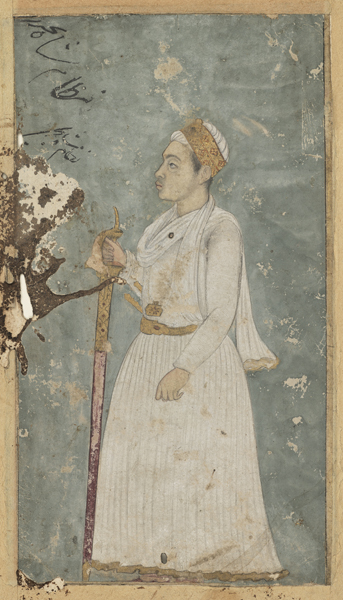
- Portrait miniature of Burhan Nizam Shah III, c. 1620

11th Sultan of Ahmadnagar
- Reign: 1610–1631
- Predecessor: Murtaza Nizam Shah II
- Successor: Hussain Nizam Shah III
- Regent: Malik Ambar
- Regent: Fateh Khan
- Died: 1631
- Cause of death: Assassination
- Issue: Hussain Nizam Shah III
- House: Nizam Shahi Dynasty
- Father: Murtaza Nizam Shah II

Burhan Nizam Shah III was the ruler of the Ahmadnagar Sultanate from 1610 until his death in 1631.

== Early life and background ==
Burhan was the son of Murtaza Nizam Shah II, who was effectively a puppet king under Malik Ambar. His mother was either a Persian wife of Murtaza, or Malik Ambar's daughter.

In 1610, owing to a quarrel between these two wives of Murtaza, Malik Ambar had both Murtaza and the Persian wife poisoned. He subsequently installed Murtaza's five-year-old son, Burhan on the throne.

== Reign ==
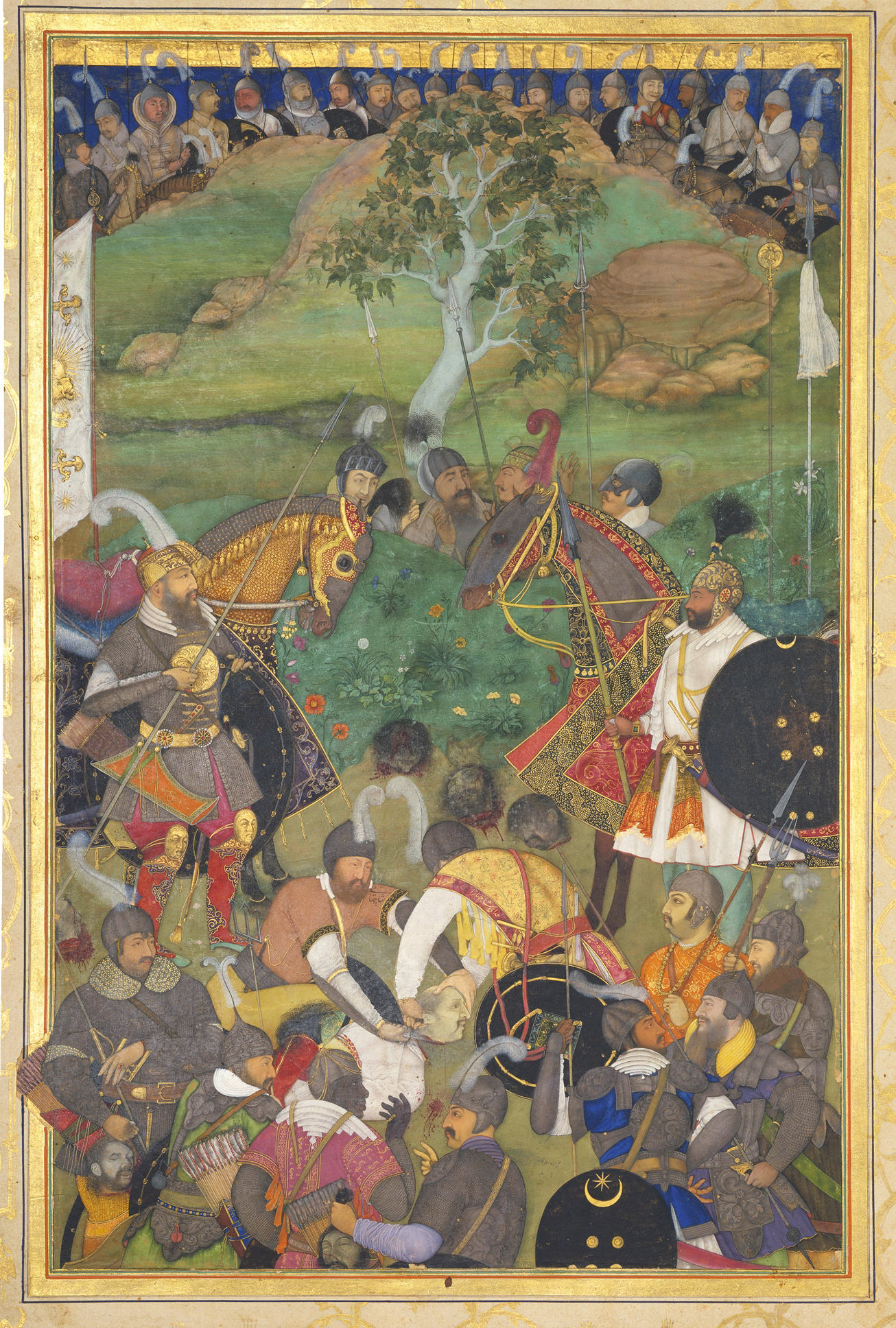
The treacherous Mughal Viceroy of the Deccan Khan Jahan Lodi was executed in the year 1630, for covertly allying himself with Burhan Nizam Shah III, against the Mughal Emperor Shah Jahan.

In 1627, Burhan sent a force led by Fateh Khan to attack the Mughal territory, but this army was defeated by the Mughal forces, led by Khan-i-Jahan Lodi and Lashkar Khan. Fateh, suspected of colluding with the Mughals was imprisoned by Burhan's orders.

Khan-i-Jahan Lodi rebelled against the Mughals and was given refuge by Burhan. In addition, Burhan was also attempting to enter into an alliance with the kingdoms of Bijapur and Golconda.

Shah Jahan, upon his ascension, seems to have perceived that as long as the Nizam Shahi dynasty reigned, Mughal interests in the Deccan could not be achieved. He sent envoys to Bijapur and Golconda, in order to prevent an alliance between these kingdoms and Burhan. Khan Jahan Lodi was killed in 1631.

=== Death ===
Fateh Khan was asked to assassinate Burhan in order to prove his loyalty to the Mughals. Fateh Khan deposed and killed Burhan, and installed his son Husain on the throne.
