= Murtaza Nizam Shah II =

Sultan of Ahmadnagar from 1600 to 1610

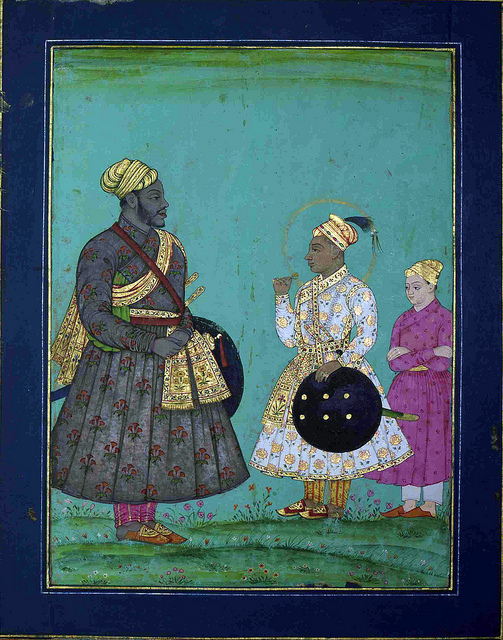
- Murtaza Nizam Shah with an African Peshwa (Malik Ambar) and a younger man

10th Sultan of Ahmadnagar
- Reign: 1600 – 1610
- Predecessor: Bahadur Nizam Shah
- Successor: Burhan Nizam Shah III
- Regent: Malik Ambar
- Born: Ali c. 1580
- Died: 1610 (aged 29–30)
- Spouse: Persian woman Daughter of Malik Ambar
- Issue: Burhan Nizam Shah III
- House: Nizam Shahi Dynasty
- Father: Shah Ali
- Religion: Islam

Murtaza Nizam Shah II (c. 1580–1610) was the Sultan of Ahmadnagar from 1600 to 1610. His rule was dominated by the powerful regent Malik Ambar, under whom he was an effective puppet ruler.

== Life ==
Born c. 1580, he was originally given the name Ali at birth. His father Shah Ali was a younger son of Burhan Nizam Shah I (r.1509–1553) by Bibi Mariam, a daughter of Yusuf Adil Shah, the Sultan of Bijapur.

Following the fall of Chand Bibi in 1600, the former sultan, Bahadur Nizam Shah, was captured and imprisoned by the Mughal prince Daniyal. The military commander Malik Ambar chose to use this power vacuum to strengthen his own position. Aware of his limited resources at that time, he sought out a member of the ruling family to use as a unifying symbol among the populace. Though all the royal children had been taken captive by the Mughals, Malik Ambar discovered the twenty-year-old Ali residing in Paranda. Though Ali's father Shah Ali was still alive at that point, at eighty years old he was viewed as a less preferable potential monarch in comparison to his son.

Malik Ambar approached Ibrahim Adil Shah II, with whom the younger prince had taken refuge in Bijapur, to ask for permission for Ali to accept the crown. However, Shah Ali was hesitant to give his own approval to the proposal, mistrustful of the commander's promises of safety for his son. To inspire confidence in the old prince, Malik Ambar offered to give own his daughter in marriage to Ali. Shah Ali agreed and the young prince married the daughter in an elaborate ceremony, before being raised to the throne with the name Murtaza Nizam Shah II.

Malik Ambar, under his new official position as Peshwa (prime minister) and regent, made Paranda the new capital and did much to restore stability to the kingdom. However, over the years the sultan began to chafe under the regency. When a truce was established between Ahmadnagar and the Mughals, Murtaza became offended by the development. He endorsed a rival of Malik Ambar, Raju Daccani, which resulted in a lengthy war between the two nobles.

Murtaza continued to intrigue and form factions against Malik Ambar, instigating a number of rebellions against him. Ambar grew frustrated with the Sultan's duplicity and sought the advice of Ibrahim Adil Shah II, who disapproved of having Murtaza deposed. Ibrahim intervened on behalf of the Sultan and restored relations between the two for a time. However, in 1610 another, more serious quarrel occurred when Murtaza's Persian wife from an earlier marriage became embroiled in a verbal altercation with Malik Ambar's daughter. The former referred to her co-wife as a slave-girl to the Sultan, and the regent himself as a rebel. Ambar's daughter complained to her father, who in anger had both Murtaza and the wife poisoned by his secretary.

Murtaza's five-year-old son, who was either his child by the Persian wife or by Malik Ambar's daughter, was subsequently enthroned under the name Burhan Nizam Shah III.
