= Fath Khan =

De-facto ruler of the Ahmadnagar Sultanate

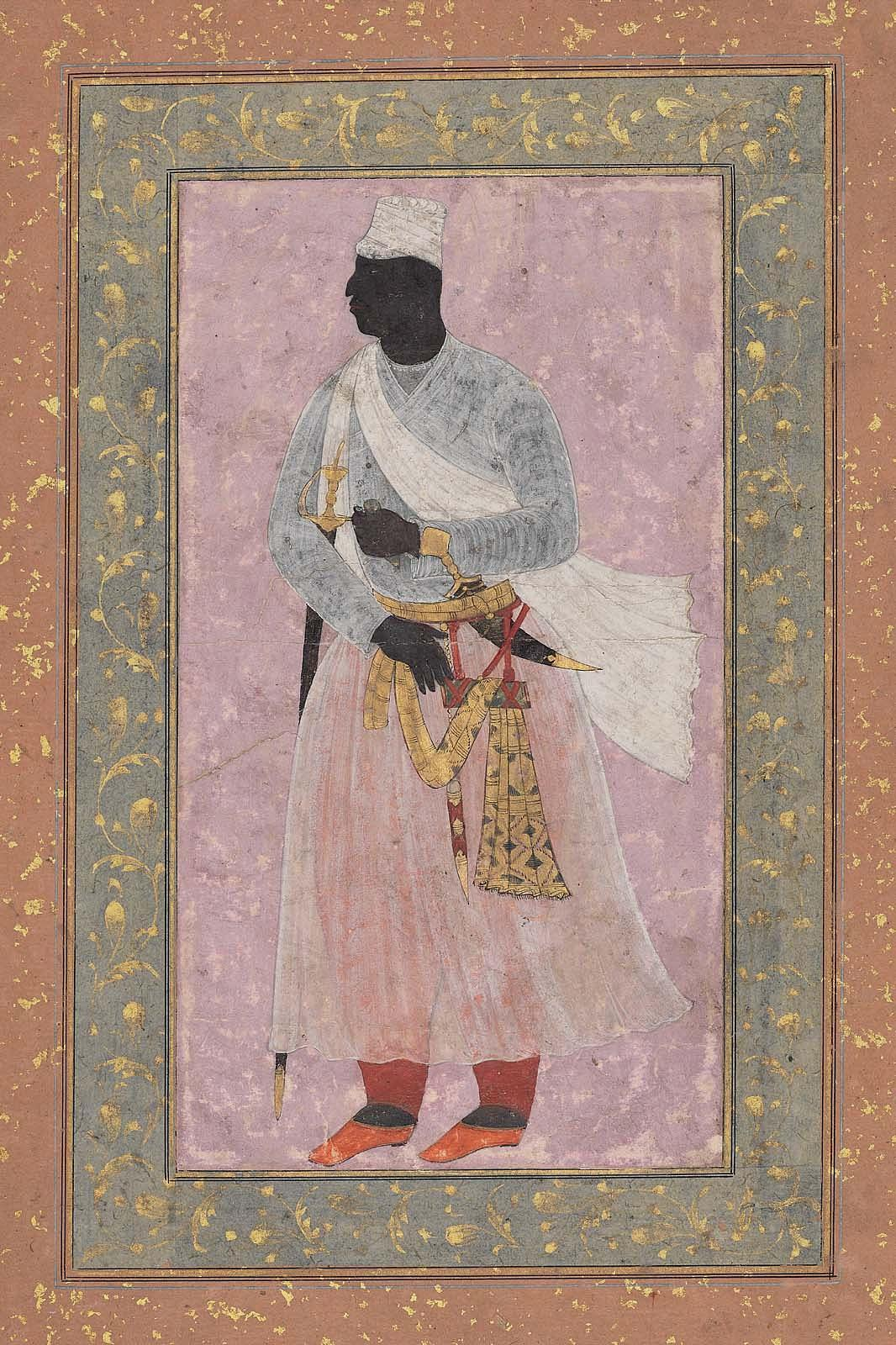
- Painting of Fath Khan c. 1610-1620, Museum of Fine Arts, Boston

Peshwa of the Ahmadnagar Sultanate
- In office 1626 – June 1633
- Monarchs: Burhan Nizam Shah III; Hussain Nizam Shah III
- Preceded by: Malik Ambar

Personal details
- Born: Aziz Malik
- Died: Lahore, Lahore Subah, Mughal Empire
- Relations: Changiz Khan (brother); Abdul Rasul (son); Yaqut Khan (father-in-law)
- Parent: Malik Ambar (father)

Military service
- Battles/wars: Siege of Daulatabad (1633)

Fath Khan, also written as Fateh Khan, was a 17th-century political figure of the Ahmadnagar Sultanate, a historical principality spanning the Western Deccan region in the Indian subcontinent. He was the eldest son of Malik Ambar, the Peshwa (prime minister) of the Ahmadnagar Sultanate. He succeeded his father as the Sultanate's de facto ruler after the latter's death in 1626, and served as Peshwa until his imprisonment in 1633. His tenure, lasting less than a decade, spanned the eclipse days of the kingdom; it was characterised by internal strife and political pressure from the Mughal Empire. He played a key role in the kingdom's collapse by defecting to the Mughal Empire, and killed the ruler Burhan Nizam Shah III in the name of Mughal emperor Shah Jahan. His political career came to an end with the Siege of Daulatabad, after which he submitted to the Mughal emperor and became his pensioner.

== Personal life ==
Fath Khan's original name was Aziz Malik. He was the eldest of Malik Ambar's two sons, the younger being Changiz Khan. Patrilineally, Fath Khan was of Ethiopian descent. Among the sociocultural groups and identities active in the politics of the Deccan Sultanates, Fath Khan was not perceived to fall under the grouping of habshi (lit. 'Abyssinian') like his father, but instead bore the title muwallad (lit. 'of mixed origins'). In his time and context, this signified the shedding of his father's status as a military slave, and typically meant greater acceptance into elite circles of the court.

Malik Ambar trained Fath Khan to be his natural successor as de facto ruler of the Ahmadnagar Sultanate. He arranged Fath Khan's marriage to the daughter of Yaqut Khan, a leading Adil Shahi commander who was also of Ethiopian extraction. The marriage took place in 1609 and was celebrated grandly. It had the effect of strengthening ties with the Bijapur Sultanate at a time when Mughal political pressure bore down on both kingdoms. Fath Khan's eldest son was named Abdul Rasul.

== Career ==
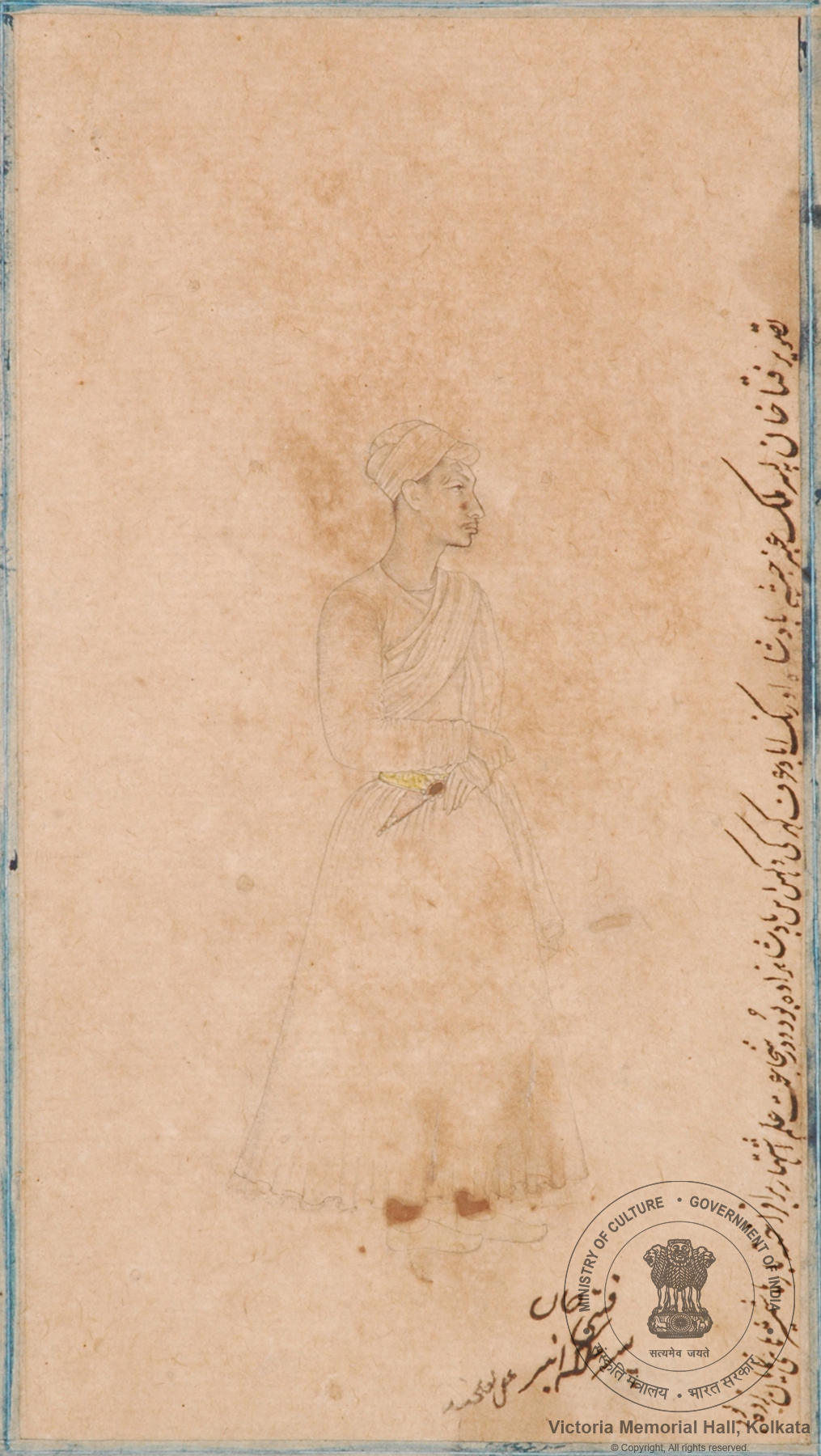
Portrait of Fateh Khan as a prince by Lal Chand, Victoria Memorial, Kolkata

Following the death of his father in 1626, Fath Khan succeeded him as Peshwa (prime minister) and regent of the Ahmadnagar Sultanate, appointed by the ruler Burhan Nizam Shah III. His appointment was not well received by Deccani and Habshi groups at court, resulting in defections to the Mughal Empire. Fath Khan sought the support of an influential Ethiopian noble named Hamid Khan; however, the latter aspired to build his own power base.

The Mughal emperor Shah Jahan ascended the throne around this time and placed significant pressure on the kingdom, deputing multiple military campaigns. Burhan Nizam Shah hoped that Fath Khan could help forge peace with the Mughals, but Fath Khan instead opened negotiations with Shah Jahan, willing to cede the Berar and Balaghat regions. Fath Khan secretly resisted impending Mughal invasion by collaborating with local groups to block the roads, but his willingness to engage the Mughal emperor alarmed the Nizam Shahi nobility. Fath Khan was promptly imprisoned by Burhan Nizam Shah and Hamid Khan at Junnar. However, he managed to escape and marched to Ahmadnagar with his army. He was then defeated by Hamid Khan and his forces, and imprisoned at Daulatabad by Hamid Khan and Burhan Nizam Shah.

Following Fath Khan's imprisonment, the king Burhan Nizam Shah faced the desertion of key figures of the court, due to the weakening position of the kingdom in the face of Mughal imperialism. In desperation, Burhan Nizam Shah freed Fath Khan on 18 January 1631, and reappointed him to his former position. Fath Khan's unpopularity contributed to further desertion, such as that of the noble Muqarrab Khan. Fath Khan put his opponent Hamid Khan to death. Aware of his precarious position in court, and facing the possibility that the Nizam Shah could turn against him once again, he imprisoned Burhan Nizam Shah, declaring him insane. He simultaneously put to death twenty-five leading members of the court, and reopened negotiations with Mughal emperor Shah Jahan, offering to recognize Mughal sovereignty.

Shah Jahan responded asking Fath Khan to prove the sincerity of his claims, upon which Fath Khan put Burhan Nizam Shah to death, and installed the king's 10-year-old son as ruler Husayn III. Publicly, Fath Khan claimed he was not responsible for Burhan's death. Fath Khan also struck coins and had the khutba read in Shah Jahan's name, symbolising Mughal sovereignty. Shah Jahan made further demands of the Nizam Shah's wealth, which were also granted. In return, Fath Khan received some of the jagirs (land grants) of Shahaji Bhonsle, a Mughal officer; this prompted the latter to desert the Mughals. Appeased with the submission, Shah Jahan departed the Deccan in 1632 for northern India, leaving the Mughal noble Mahabat Khan to govern the Deccan.

With the departure of Shah Jahan, and Fath Khan now acting as the sole head of the Sultanate, the Adil Shahi ruler sought to lay claim to the Sultanate and deputed an army against Daulatabad, the seat of the Nizam Shahis. Fath Khan wrote to Mahabat Khan seeking protection, who deputed a Mughal force to march to Fath Khan's aid. As the forces advanced, an Abyssinian officer of the Adil Shahis named Randola Khan persuaded Fath Khan to switch sides and oppose the Mughals, offering a lump sum. Fath Khan now resolved to defend the fort of Daulatabad from the Mughal army. Upon hearing of the treachery, Mahabat Khan himself arrived in Daulatabad and commenced the Siege of Daulatabad around March 1633. The siege concluded in June the same year, when Fath Khan surrendered to Mahabat Khan and was imprisoned. He was then brought to Agra along with Husayn Nizam Shah, where he surrendered before Shah Jahan. The surrender was meant to signify the final Mughal annexation of the Sultanate, but in reality Nizam Shahi resistance continued through 1636, chiefly led by Shahaji Bhonsle.

== Later life ==
Fath Khan was pardoned by the Mughal emperor; his jagirs were restored to him, and he received an allowance of two lakh rupees. Around 1642–1643, he raised a rebellion against Mughal authority in Chaul, which was only subdued after a major military expedition; this was one of several examples of continued resistance from Nizam Shahi nobles. Fath Khan later retired to Lahore, and died a natural death.

== Bibliography ==
- Fischel, Roy S (2020). Local states in an imperial world: identity, society and politics in the early modern Deccan. Edinburgh: Edinburgh University Press. ISBN 978-1-4744-3609-0.
- Radhey, Shyam (1966). The Kingdom of Ahmadnagar (1 ed.). Motilal Banarsidass. ISBN 978-81-208-2651-9.
