= Bengal roofs =

Architectural style

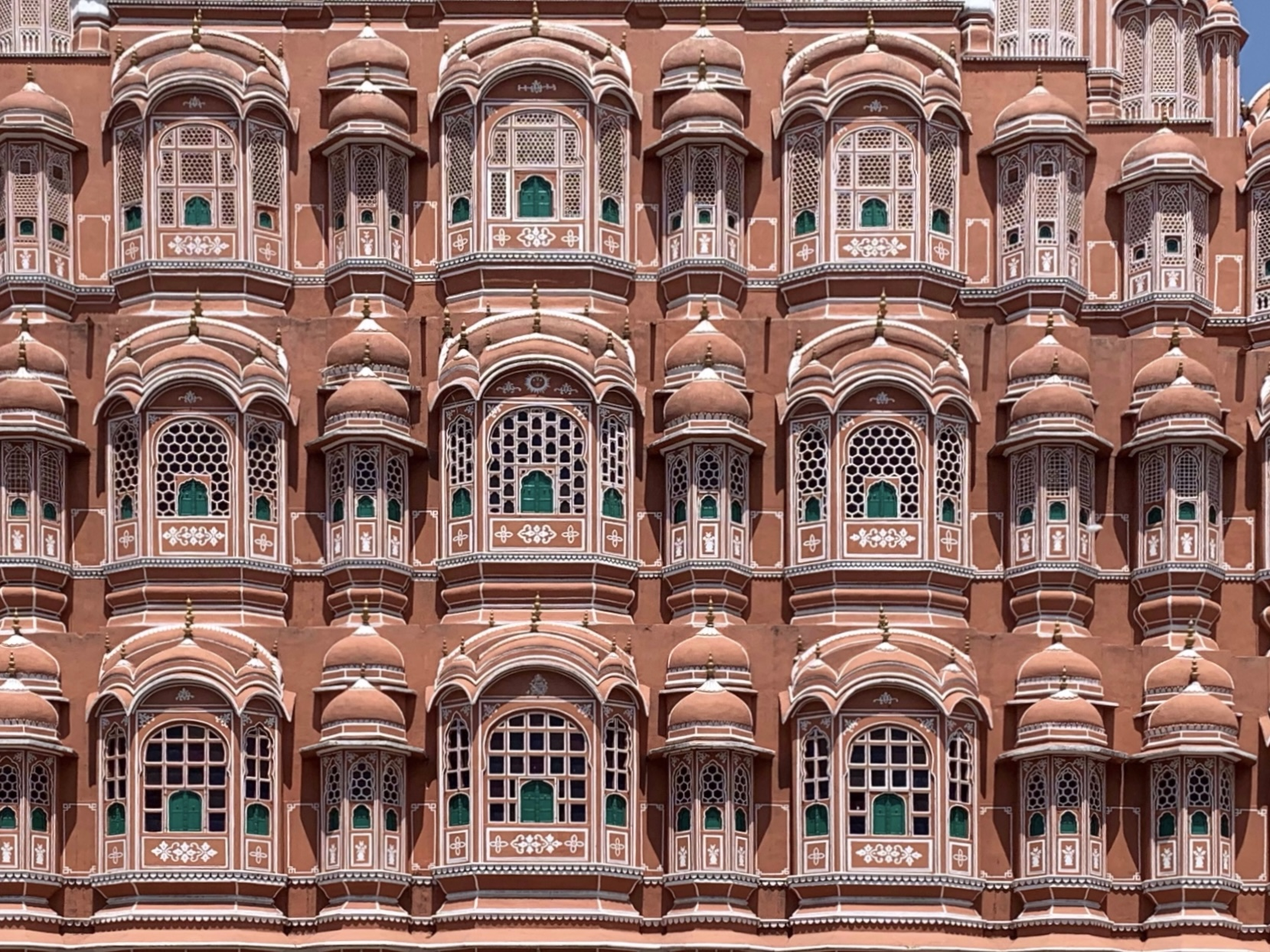
Jali panels of Hawa Mahal, Jaipur; topped with Bengal roofs

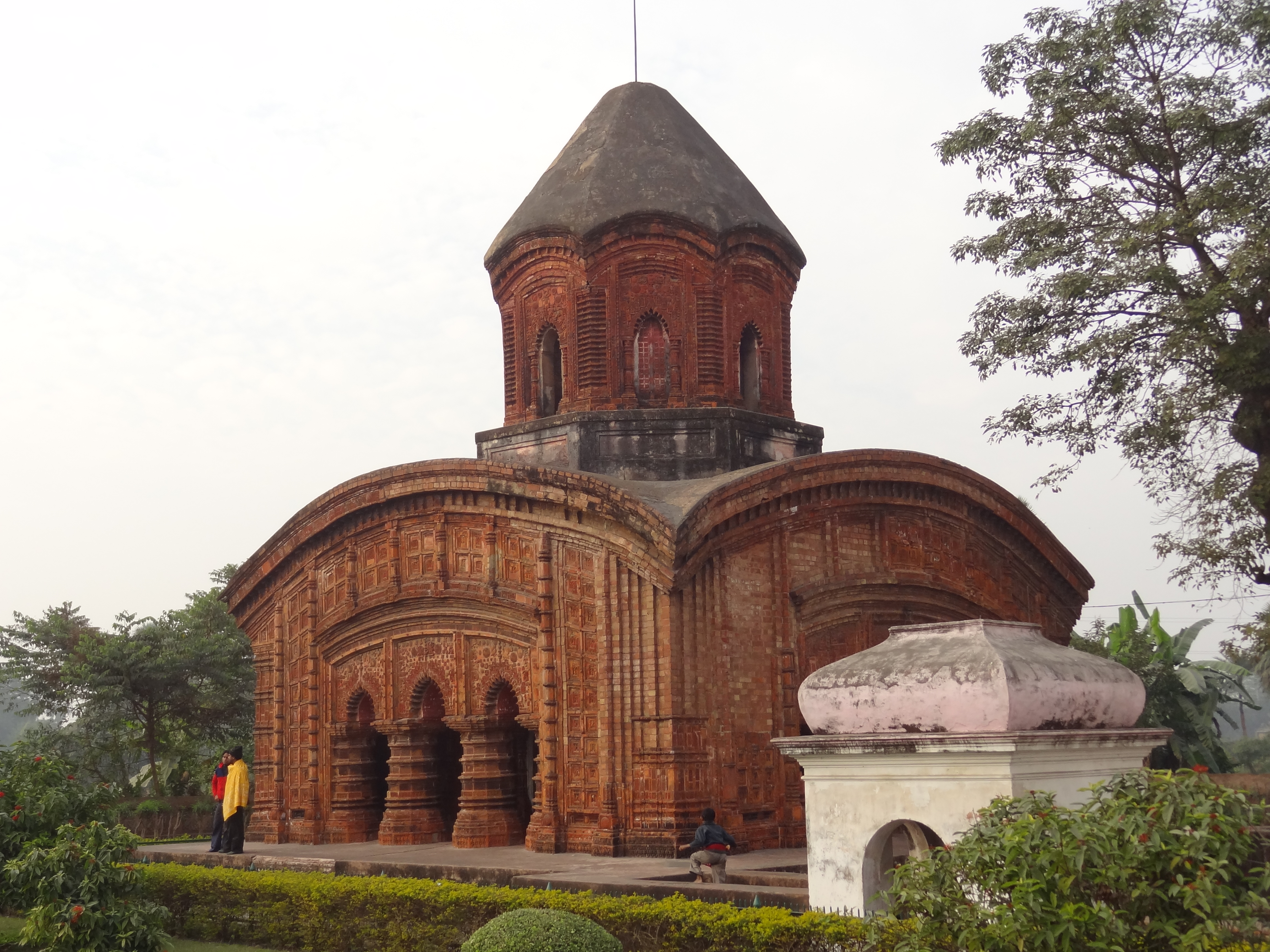
Bansberia – Ananta Basudeba-Temple (1679)

Bengal roofs are sloping dome-shaped roofs with drawn-down corners associated with late Mughal and Rajput architecture of Northern India. It is believed that stone roofs of this type did not emerge until the 16th century and can be traced back to rural models with straw or reed roofs in the rainy regions of Bengal.

== Description ==
Characteristic features of the Bengal roofs are the broad partial dome-like shape of the roof with runners down the corners. There are several common types of Bengal roofs: the do-chala type has only two hanging roof tips on each side of a roof divided in the middle by a ridge; in the rare char-chala type, the two roof halves are fused into one unit and have a dome-like shape; the double-storey at-chala type has eight roof corners, four on each level.

== History ==
Such roof forms appeared for the first time in the 16th century on royal architecture of Rajputs and Mughals. Early examples are in the Bengali ruined city of Gaur, including the Mausoleum of Fateh Khan, the son of a general of the Mughal Emperor Aurangzeb.

== Distribution ==
Two of the first Mughal buildings with echoes of Bengal roof shapes are the two outbuildings of the private palace (Khas Mahal) built by Shah Jahan around 1635 for two of his daughters in the Red Fort of Agra. A few decades later, his son Aurangzeb constructed the roof of the Pearl Mosque (Moti Masjid) in the Red Fort of Delhi in a similar manner.

However, it is especially notable in the architecture of the Rajput princes and merchants of Rajasthan, especially the countless jaroka-the roofs of the 1799 Palace of the Winds (Hawa Mahal) in Jaipur, and the roofs of the houses of rich merchants (havelis) in Jaisalmer, Mandawa and elsewhere. Some of the later memorial pavillons (chattris), built in the 18th and 19th centuries on the incineration sites of the Hindu princes of Jaisalmer and their family members, are also covered with such roofs. Similarly, since the 19th century, the builders of many Sikh temples have used this element as the coronation of their gurdwara, especially Maharaja Ranjit Singh at the Golden Temple of Amritsar.

== Gallery ==
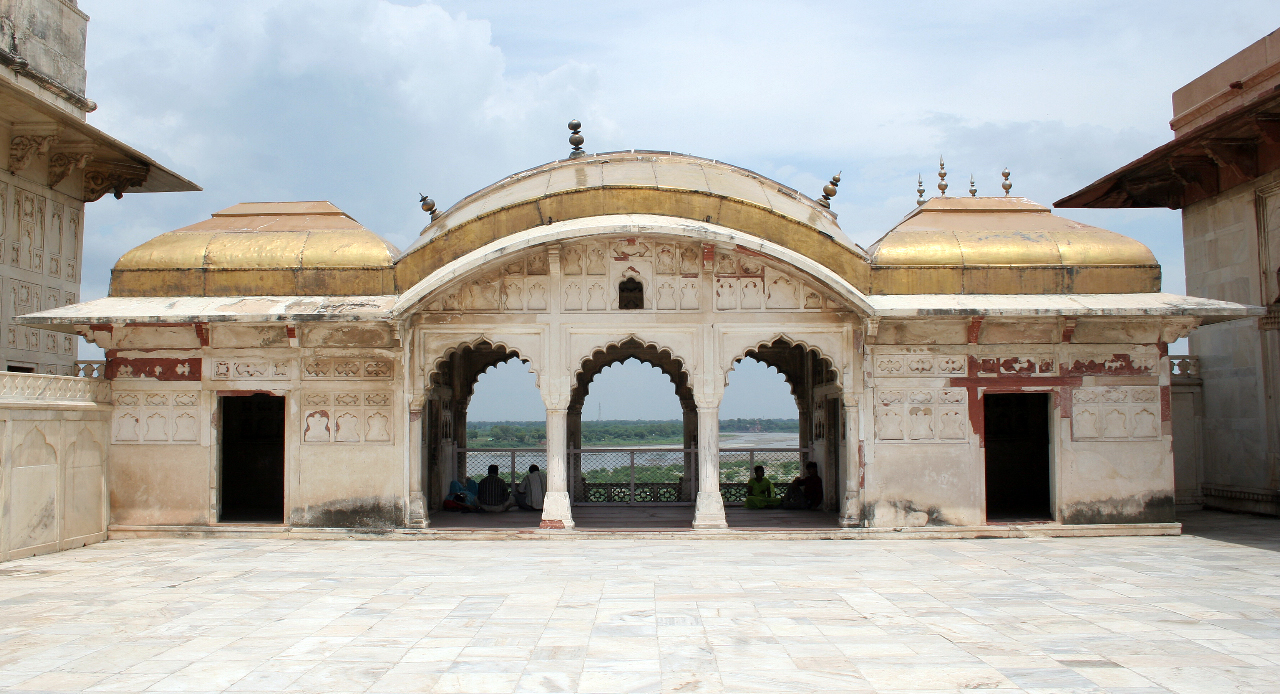
Khas-Mahal in Red Fort of Agra (in 1635)

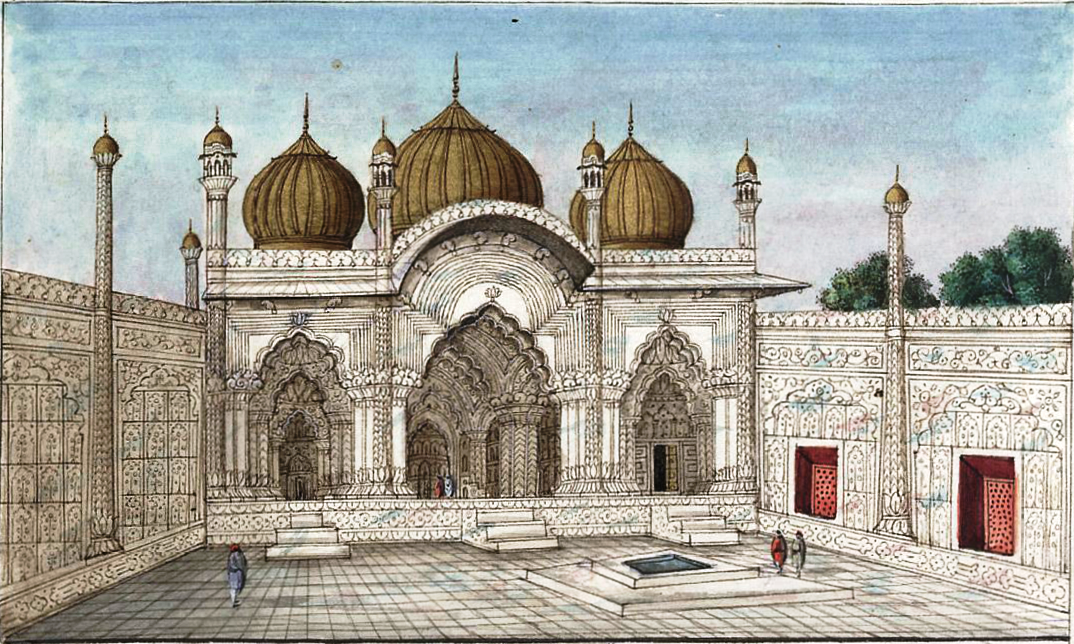
Moti Masjid in Red Fort of Delhi (1659)

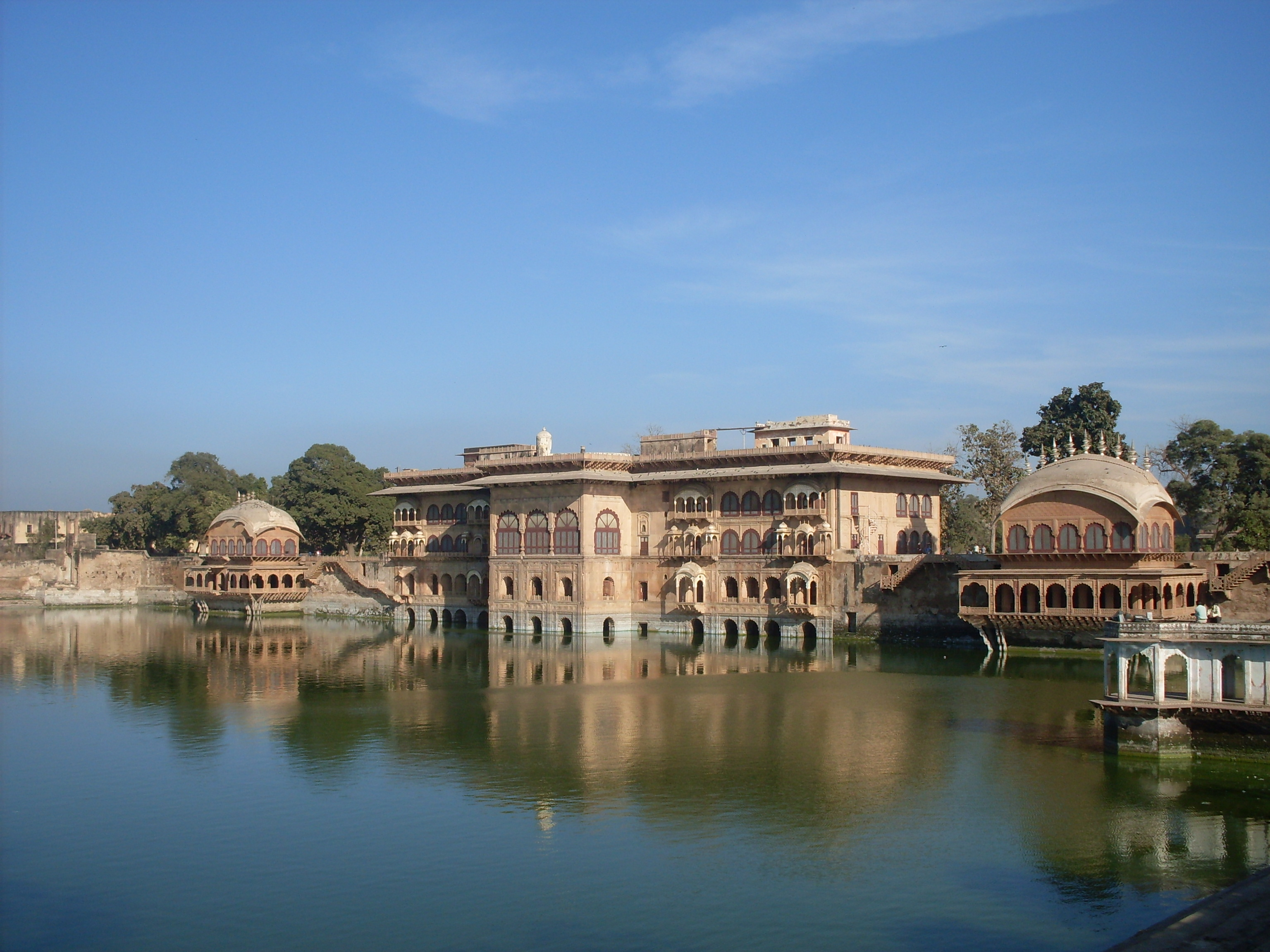
Palace in Deeg, Rajasthan (in 1750)

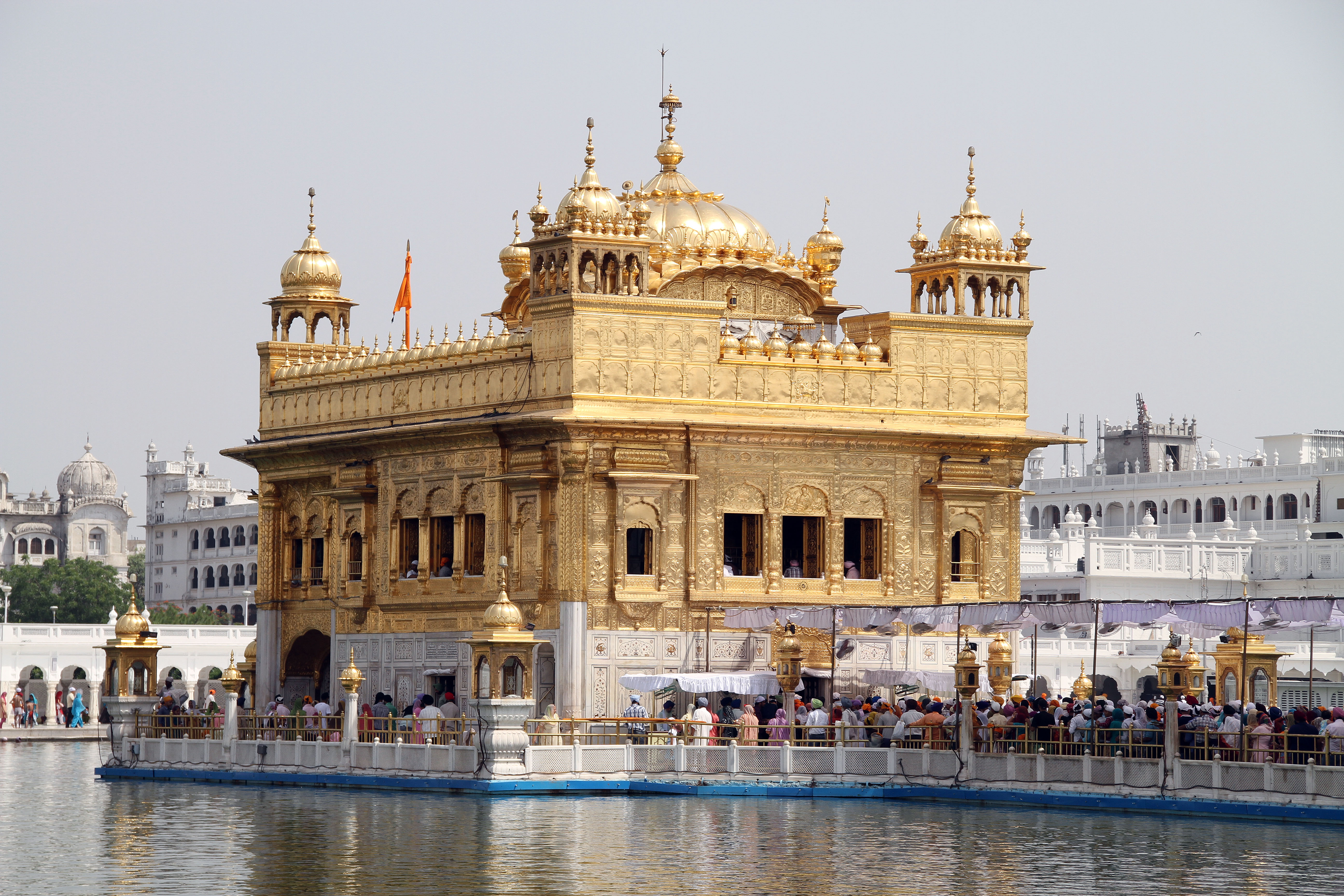
Amritsar – Harmandir Sahib (in 1830)

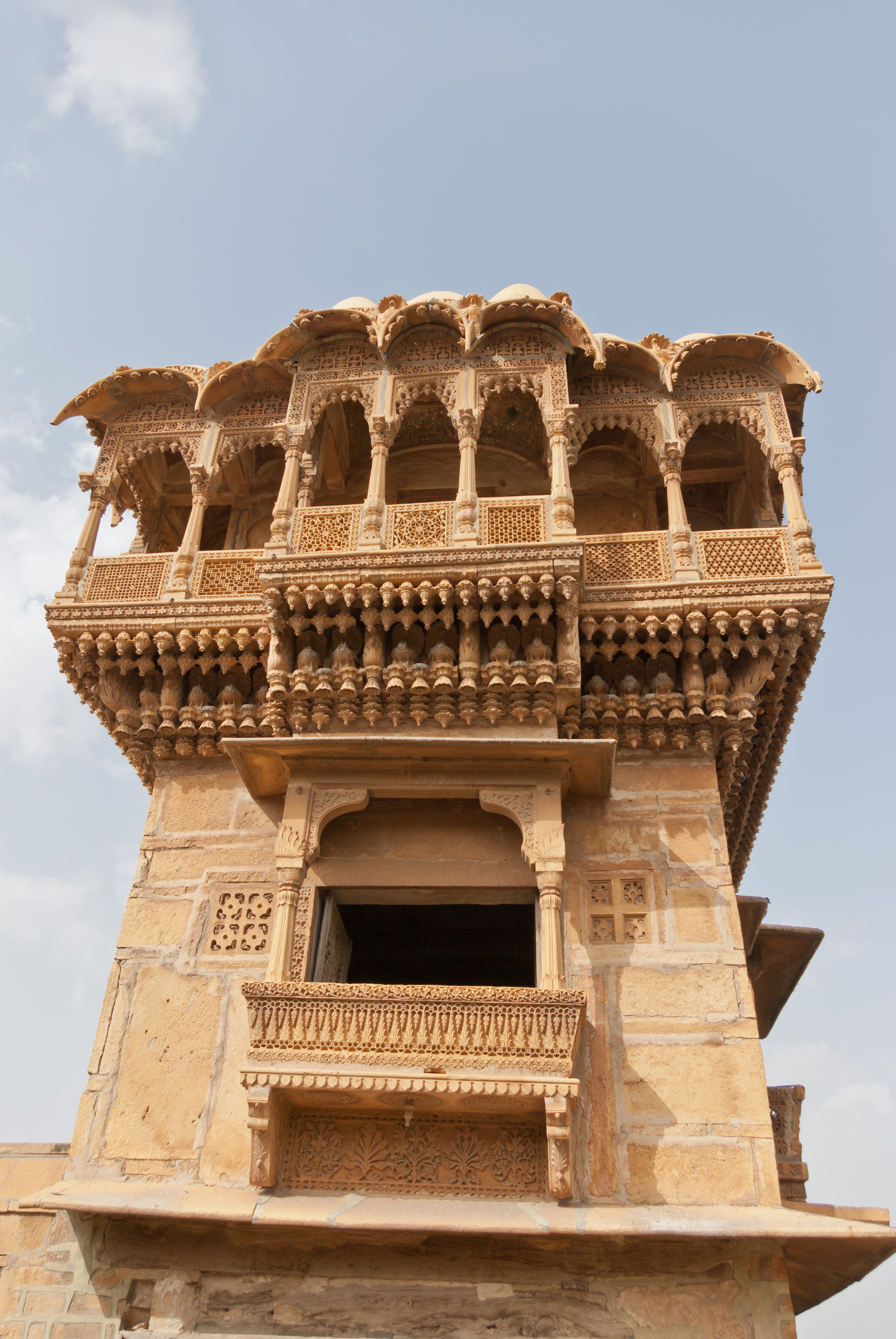
Jaisalmer – Salim Singh ki Haveli (in 1880)

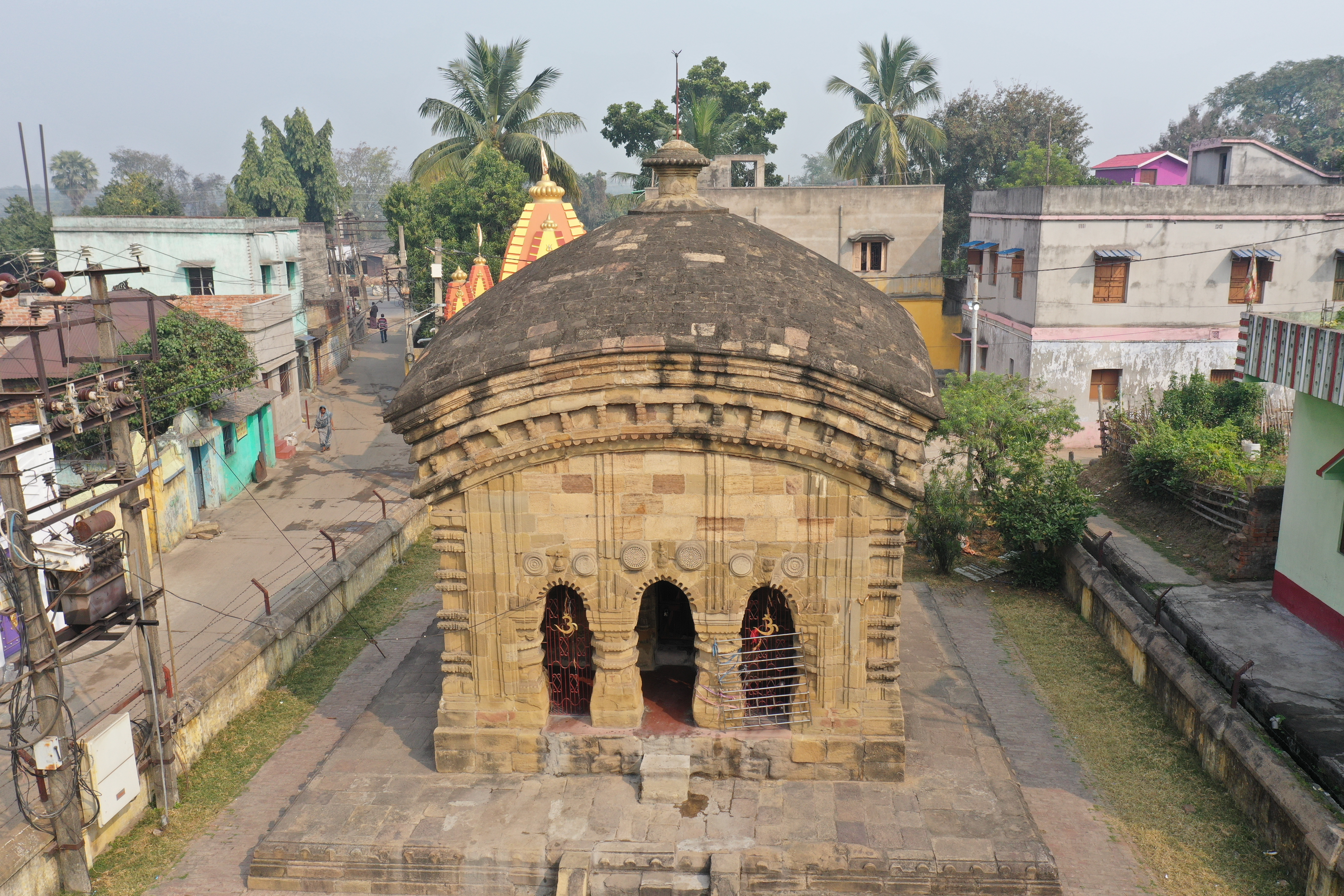
Stone Temple (14th Century), Garui, Paschim Bardhaman, West Bengal

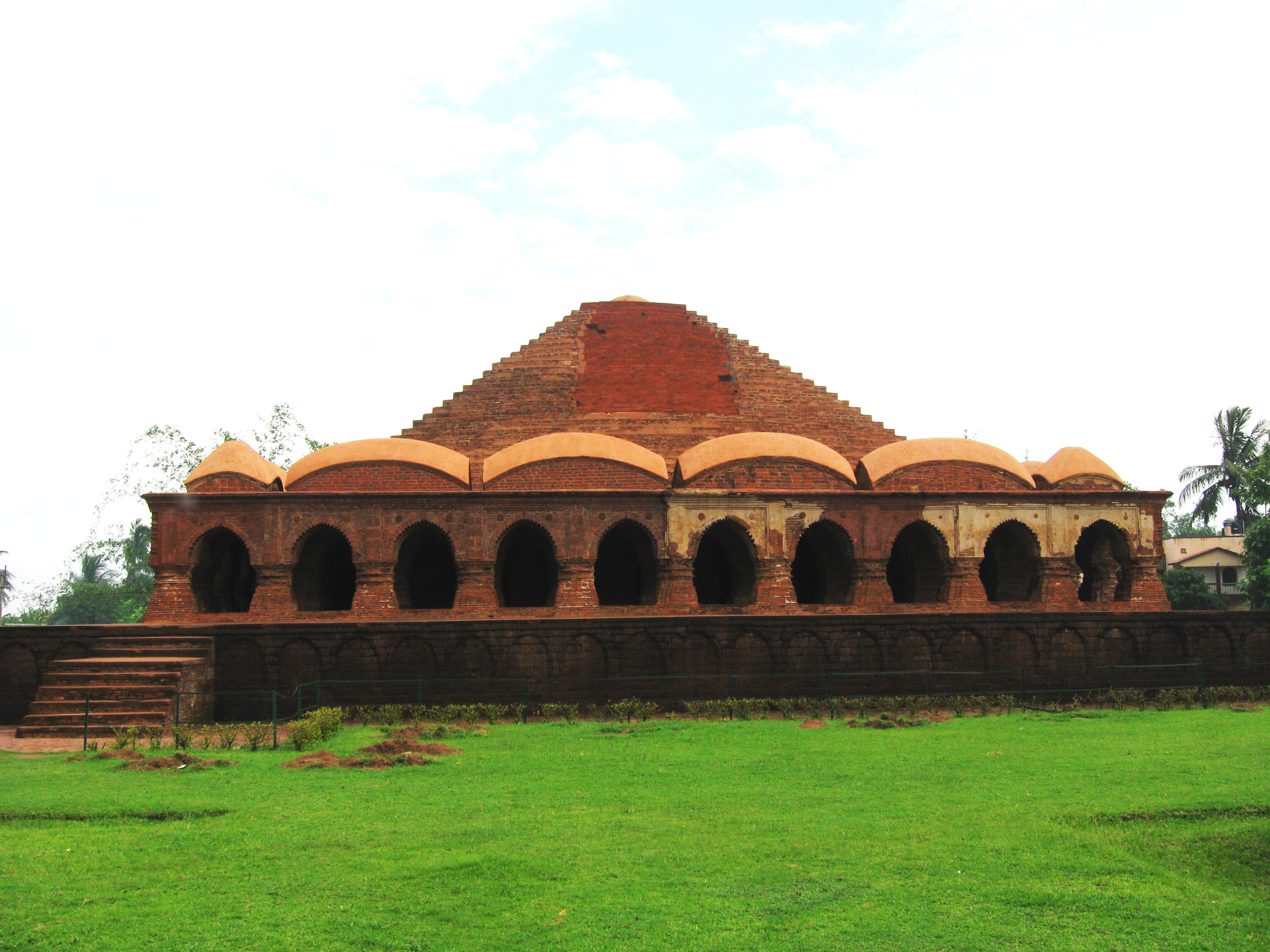
Rasmancha (1600),Bishnupur, Bankura, West Bengal

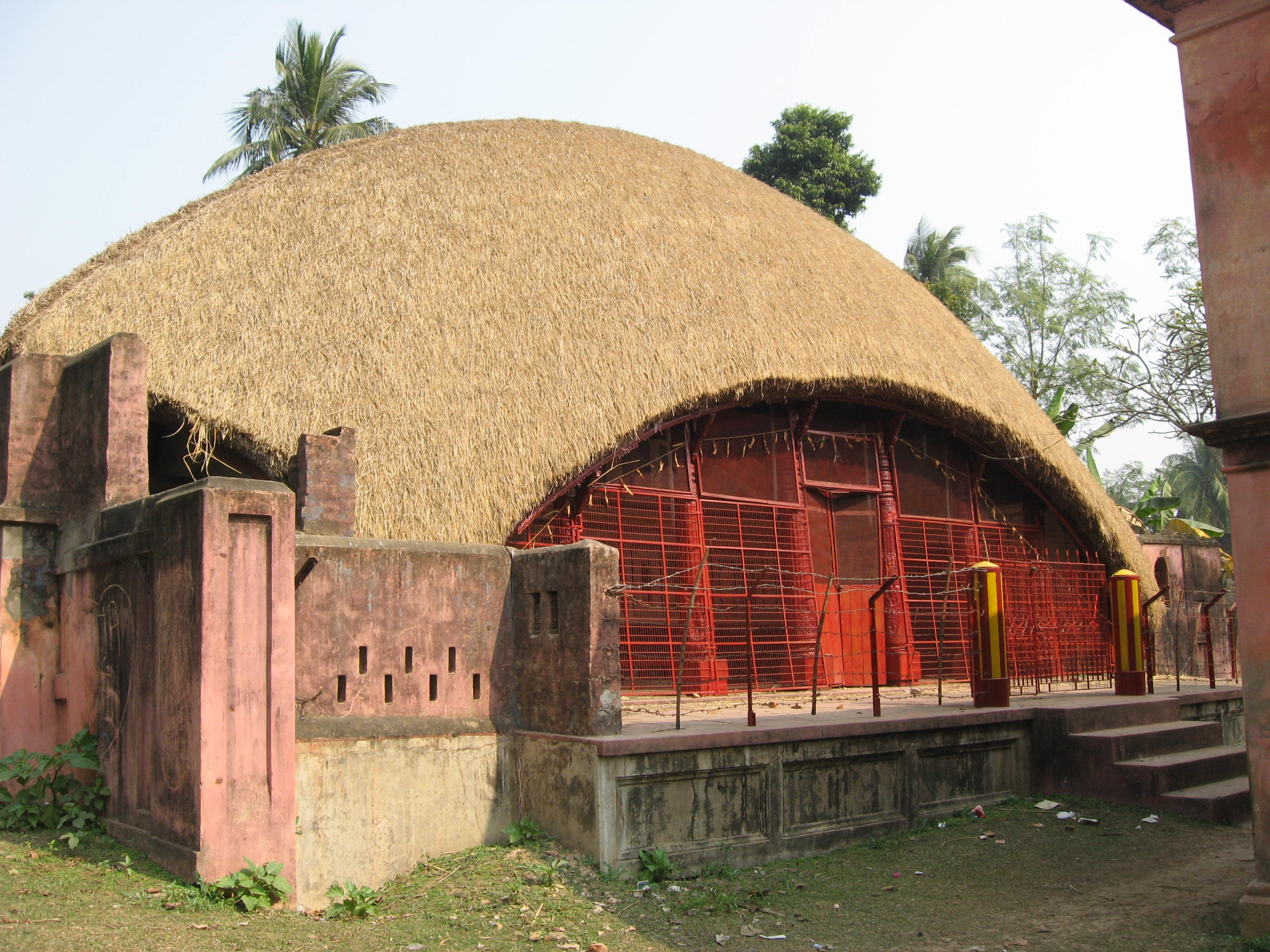
Antpur Chandimandap

== See also ==
- Architecture of Bengal
- Bengal temple architecture
- Architecture of Bangladesh
- Indo-Islamic Architecture
