= Moti Masjid (Red Fort) =

Preserved mosque in Delhi, India

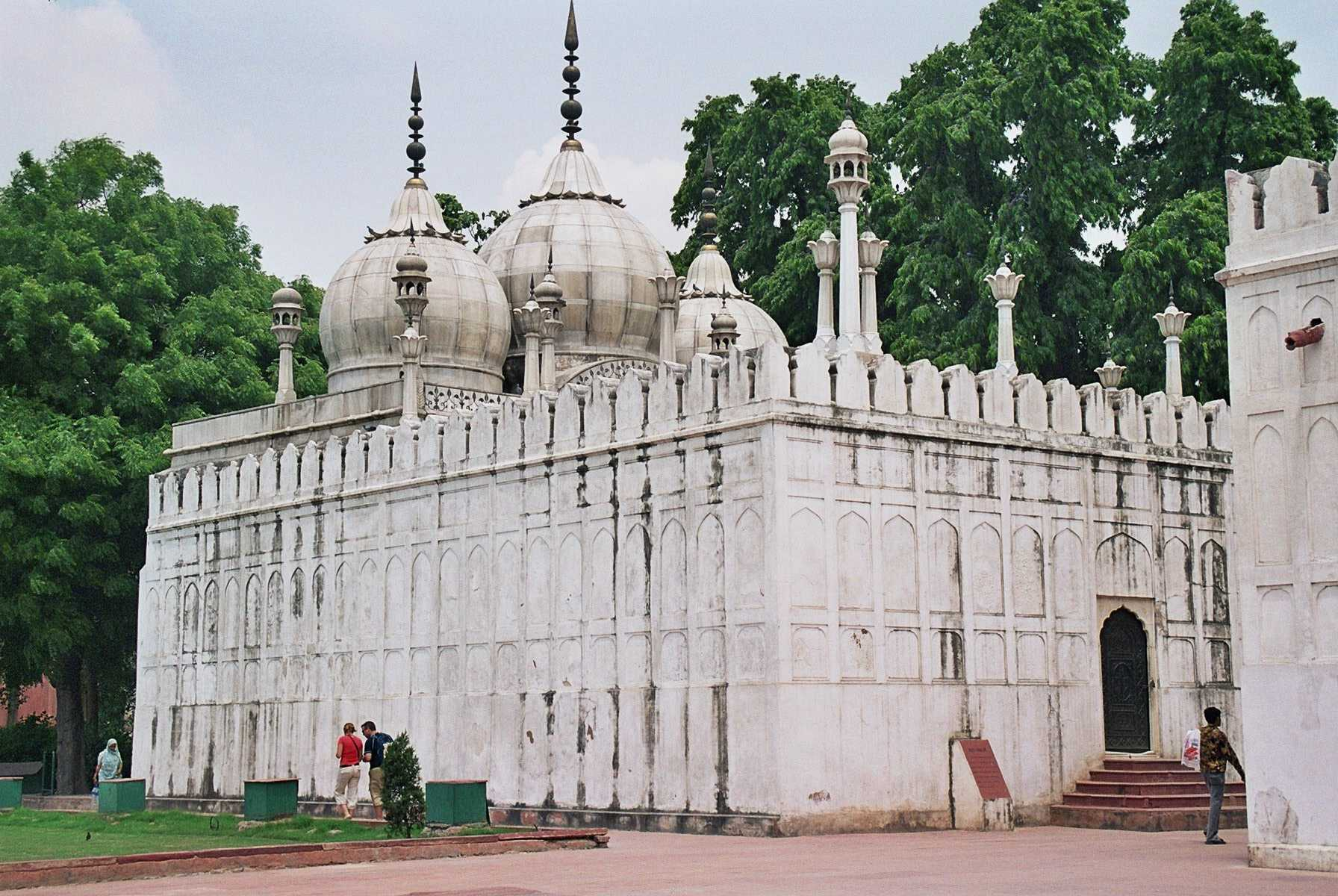

- Location of the mosque in Central Delhi

Religion
- Affiliation: Islam (former)
- Ecclesiastical or organisational status: Mosque (former)
- Status: Inactive; (preserved)

Location
- Location: Old Delhi, Central Delhi
- Country: India
- Administration: Archaeological Survey of India
- Coordinates: 28°39′25″N 77°14′35″E

Architecture
- Type: Mosque architecture
- Style: Mughal
- Founder: Aurangzeb
- Completed: 1663; 363 years ago
- Construction cost: 1 lakh and 60 thousand rupees

Specifications
- Dome: Three
- Site area: 9 by 15 m (30 by 49 ft)
- Materials: White marble; red sandstone; gilded copper (since removed)

The Moti Masjid (lit. 'Pearl mosque') is a 17th-century historical mosque, not open for worship, inside the Red Fort complex in Old Delhi, India. It was built by Mughal emperor Aurangzeb, damaged during the Siege of Delhi, and subsequently restored by the British. Named for its white marble, the mosque features ornate floral carvings. It is an important example of Mughal architecture during Aurangzeb's reign.

== History ==
The Moti Masjid was commissioned by Mughal emperor Aurangzeb, shortly after his accession. The purpose was to provide the emperor a mosque for prayer closer to his private chambers within the Red Fort. At the time, the fort did not contain a mosque; the fort's builder and previous occupant, emperor Shah Jahan, instead offered congregational prayers at the nearby Jama Masjid. Construction of the Moti Masjid took five years, completing in 1663 CE, at Aurangzeb's personal expense; the court chronicle Ma'asir-i-Alamgiri describes the cost to be 1 lakh and 60 thousand rupees. Following its construction, Aurangzeb began to offer the zuhr prayer at the mosque with officials of the state, introducing a new ceremonial practice.

In 1857, British soldiers looted the Red Fort, following its capture in the Siege of Delhi. The Moti Masjid in particular had its gilded copper domes stripped by Prize Agents (Note: British military authorised to collect the spoils of victory.) and sold at auction. The looting exposed the domes to the elements, caused them to deteriorate, and rainwater also damaged the ceiling of the prayer hall. The mosque domes were later replaced by the British in white marble.

In the 1920s, initiatives by the ASI led to a swelling of tourism at the Red Fort, and the Moti Masjid experienced increased foot traffic. This caused rules and regulations to be put in place so as to have visitors comply with Islamic conduct. In the post-Revolt era, the ASI also raised concerns over British military personnel damaging the marble floors of the mosque. In the modern era, the ASI has closed the mosque to visitors, to avoid damage to the structure.

== Architecture ==
=== Structure ===
The Moti Masjid consists of a prayer hall and courtyard, contained in a walled enclosure. The site is small, internally measuring 9 by 15 metres (30 by 49 ft). The compound is raised slightly above ground level and entered from the east, accessed by a staircase. The enclosure walls are made of red sandstone, and are of notable height, obstructing the view of the structures within. The walls also vary in thickness, compensating for the mosque's orientation - the exterior walls align with the axes of the Red Fort, while the interior walls are aligned towards Mecca. The courtyard of the mosque is rectangular, and contains a recessed pool.

Set at the end of the courtyard is the prayer hall, a three-bayed structure divided into two aisles. The structure also has corridors for use by the ladies of the court. The façade of the prayer hall features three entrance arches on piers, as well as a curvilinear eave (bangla chhajja). The mosque building is topped by three pointed domes, sitting on constricted necks, aligned with the arches in the façade. The prayer hall's marble floor is demarcated into rectangles, possibly to mark positions for worshippers.

=== Stylism ===
The Moti Masjid most closely resembles the Nagina Masjid, another small-scale palace mosque, built by Aurangzeb's predecessor Shah Jahan in the Agra Fort. Scholar Ebba Koch goes as far as to call it a near-literal copy. Both monuments have a similar plan, elevation, and building material (white marble). However, the Moti Masjid departs from the Nagina Masjid, in its extensive use of ornamentation. Unlike the Nagina Masjid, whose surfaces are plain, the Moti Masjid features a program of ornate floral decoration, executed as marble reliefs and inlays. These are found on the mosque's walls, arches, piers, and pendentives. Particularly notable are the mihrab (prayer niche) of the mosque, which features vine motifs, and the minbar (pulpit), sculpted as an acanthus vine supporting three steps. Such ornamentation stems from the palace architecture of Shah Jahan, reflected in several pavilions of the Red Fort. This is notably contrasted with the religious buildings of Shah Jahan's reign, which were more austere in nature. Dadlani views this as an innovation of Aurangzeb's reign, which also appears on his later imperial mosques. The Moti Masjid is also innovative in what Catherine Asher terms its 'spatial tension', achieved by the height of its enclosure walls and its domes; this spatial tension would become a feature of architecture during Aurangzeb's reign.

Koch noted that the ostentatious design of the mosque stands in contrast to Aurangzeb's reputation of artistic austerity. She argues that this indicates the emperor's lack of direct involvement in the stylism of the project. On the other hand, Dadlani views the monument as part of Aurangzeb's 'imperial visual program', which emphasized the construction of mosques to portray himself as a pious ruler, but also used ornamentation to recall Shah Jahan's reign, and thereby its political stability.

== Gallery ==
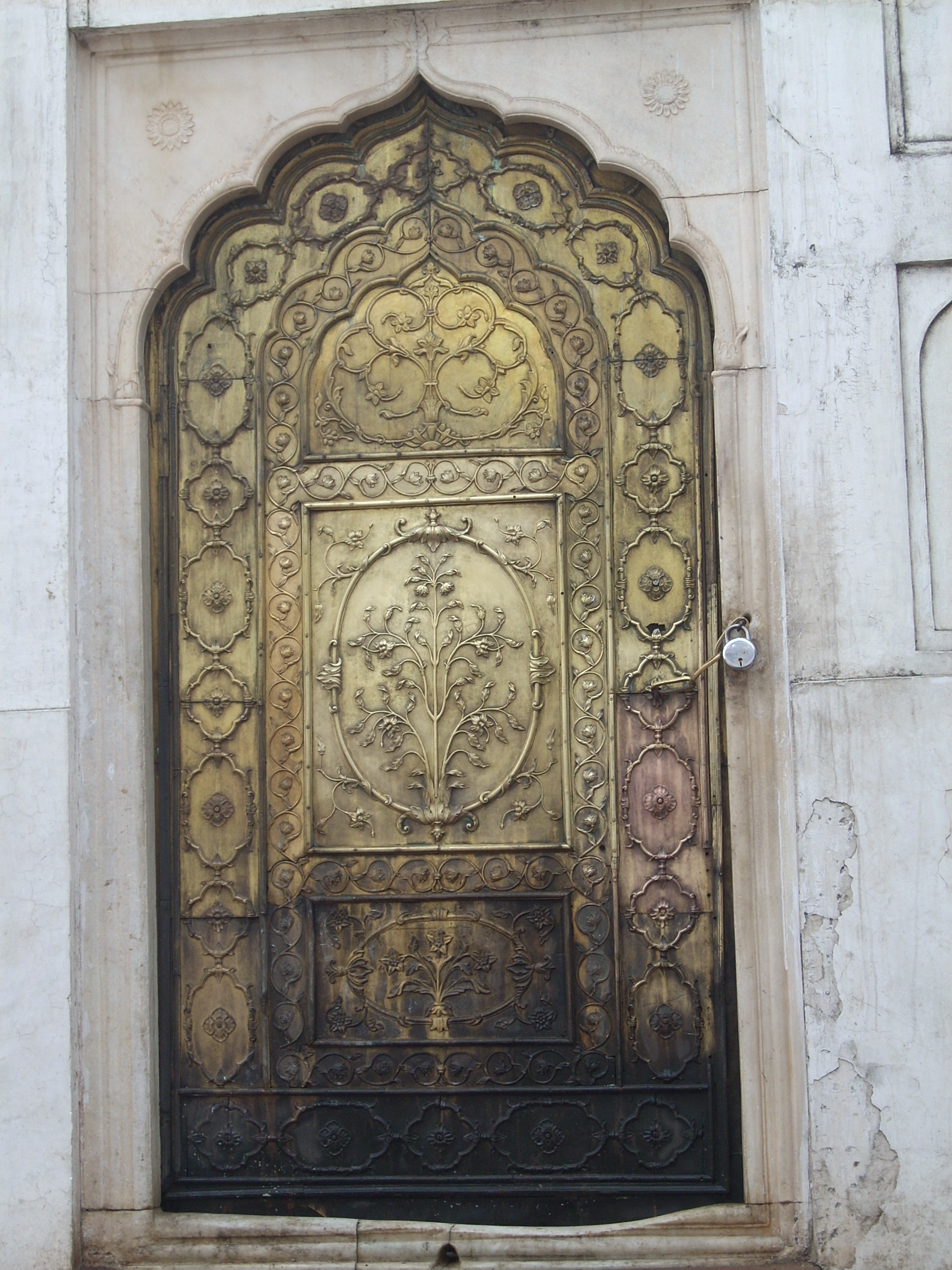
Bronze main door with floral decoration

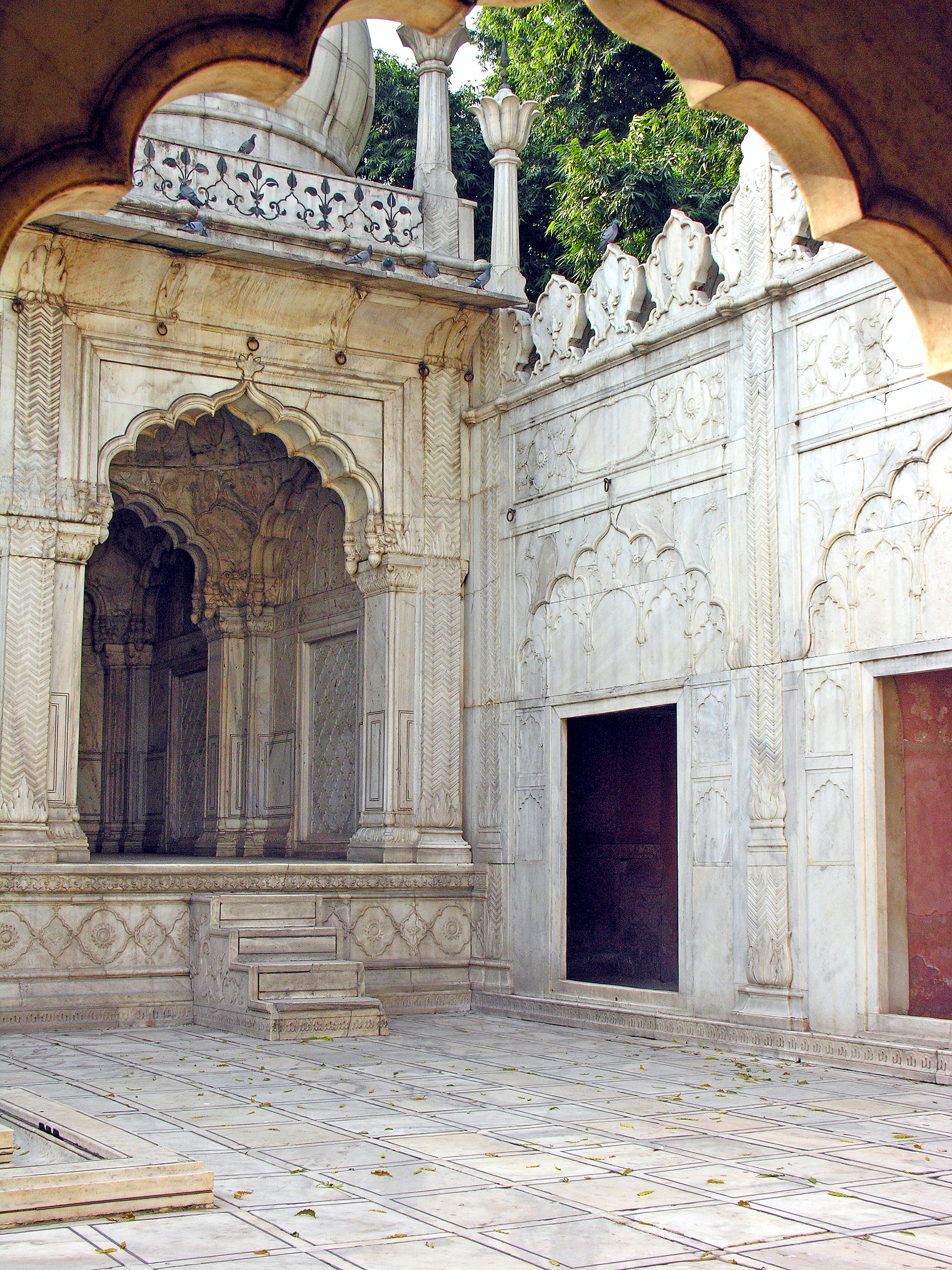
Interior of the mosque, with ornate carvings on marble surfaces

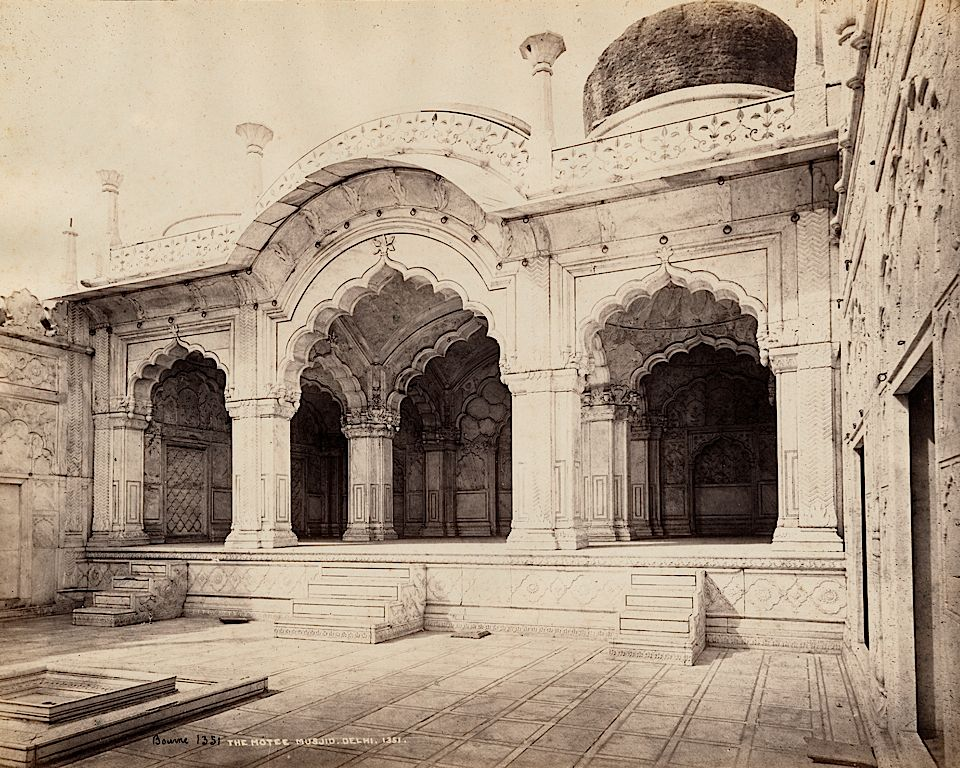
Samuel Bourne, "The Motee Musjid. Delhi. 1351," 1863–1869, photograph mounted on cardboard sheet, Department of Image Collections, National Gallery of Art Library, Washington, DC

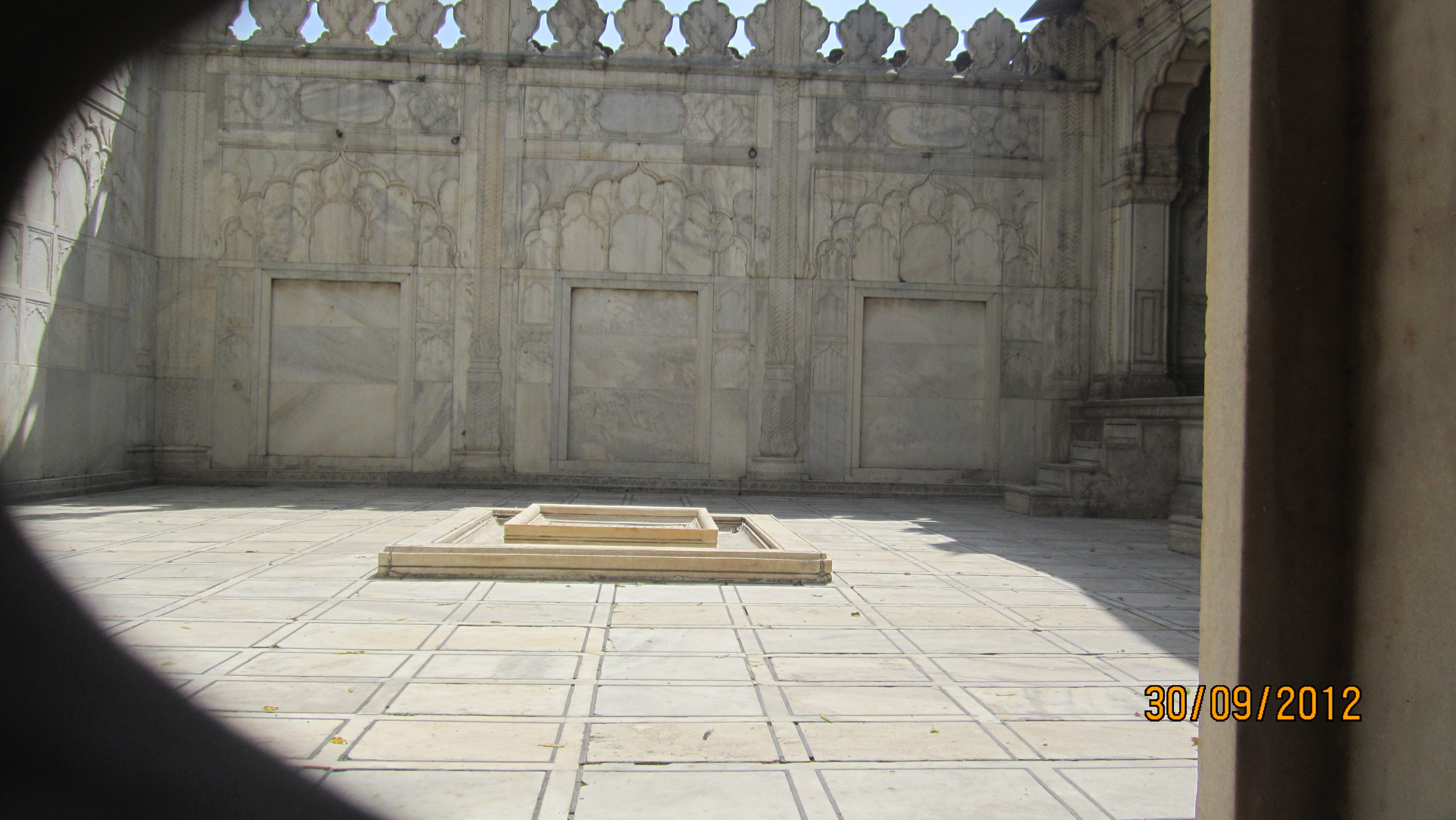
Courtyard of the mosque, containing a recessed pool

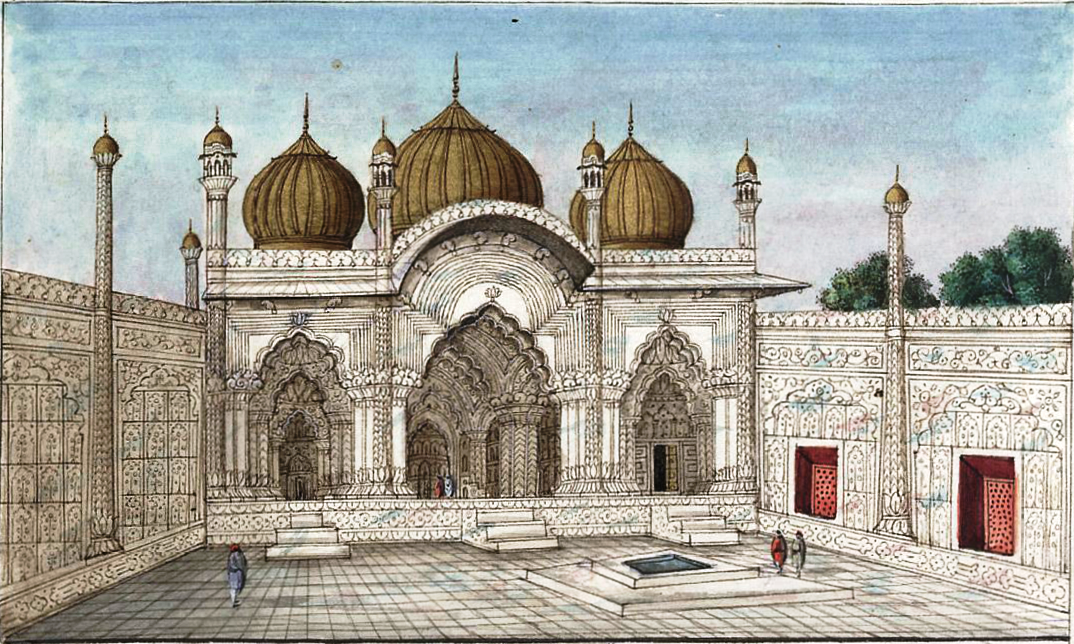
Moti Masjid in 1843 with its original gilded copper domes

== See also ==
- Islam in India
- List of mosques in India
- List of Monuments of National Importance in Delhi

== Bibliography ==
- Dadlani, Chanchal B. (12 August 2019), "Chapter 1: Between Experimentation and Regulation: The Foundations of an Eighteenth-Century Style", From Stone to Paper: Architecture as History in the Late Mughal Empire, Yale University Press, doi:10.37862/aaeportal.00054.005, ISBN 978-0-300-25096-1
