= Malik Ambar =

Prime Minister of the Ahmadnagar Sultanate and former Ethiopian slave (1548–1626)

Peshwa Malik Ambar
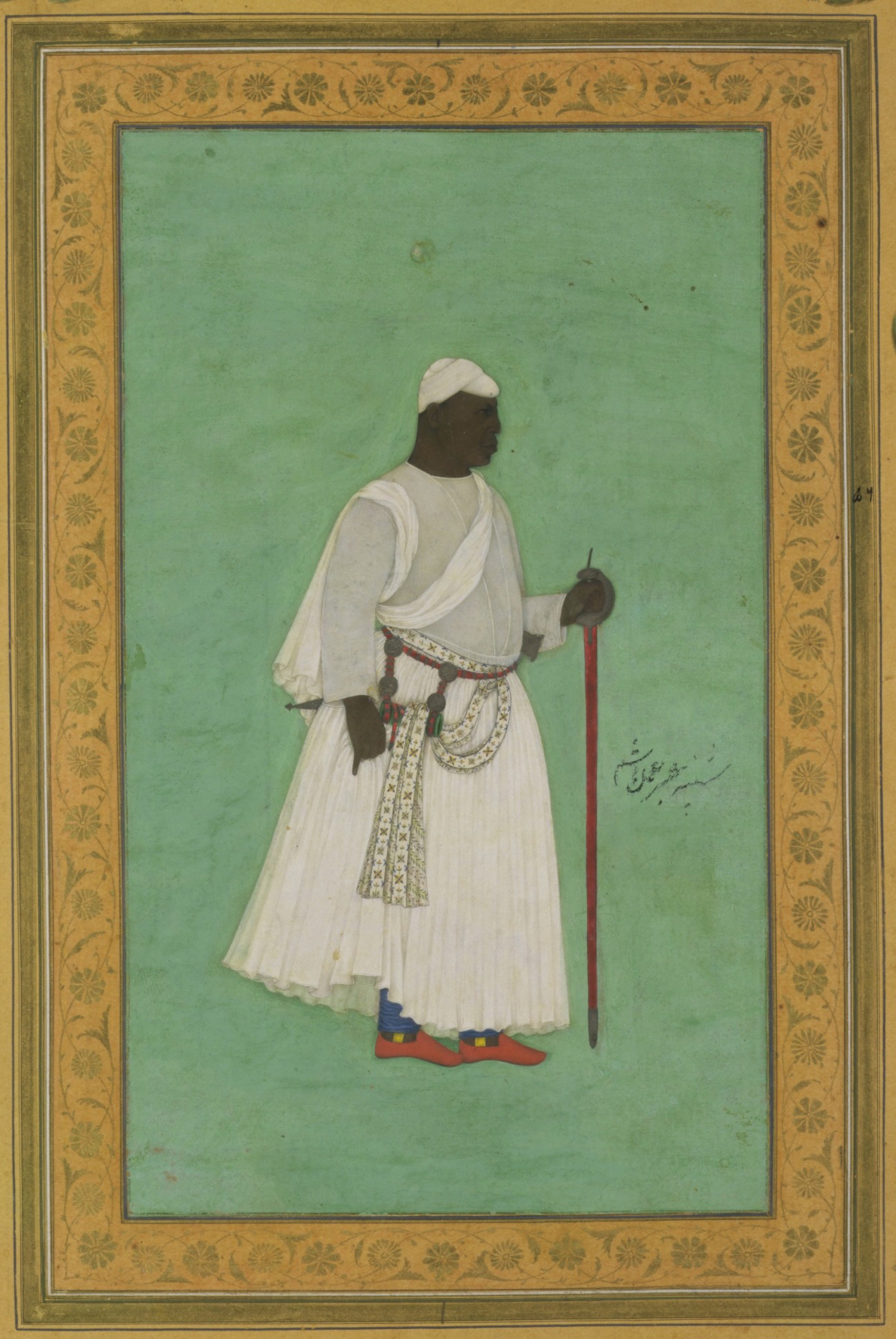
- Portrait of Malik Ambar by Mughal court artist in 1620

Peshwa of the Ahmadnagar Sultanate
- In office 1600 – 14 May 1626
- Monarchs: Murtaza Nizam Shah II; Burhan Nizam Shah III
- Succeeded by: Fath Khan

Personal details
- Born: Wako; Chapu; 1548 Haramaya, Adal Sultanate
- Died: 14 May 1626 (aged 77–78) Khuldabad, Ahmadnagar Sultanate
- Spouse: Bibi Karima
- Children: Fateh Khan; Changiz Khan; 2 daughters

Military service
- Allegiance: Nizam Shah of Ahmednagar
- Battles/wars: Siege of Ahmednagar (1619); Battle of Bhatvadi; Parviz's Deccan Expedition

Malik Ambar (1548 – 14 May 1626) was a military leader and statesman who served as the Peshwa (Prime Minister) of the Ahmadnagar Sultanate and its de facto ruler from 1600 until his death in 1626.

Originally a slave from modern day Ethiopia, Chapu, as he was known then, was sold from place to place by many slave merchants, one of whom renamed him Ambar and converted him to Islam. He was eventually brought to India, where he was bought by his last owner, the Peshwa of the Ahmadnagar Sultanate. Ambar rose through the ranks at Ahmadnagar, where he created a mercenary force numbering greater than 50,000 men. He was eventually given the title "Malik" (ملِك), meaning king in Arabic. He was based in the Deccan region and was hired by local kings. Ambar became a popular Prime Minister of the Ahmadnagar Sultanate, showing administrative acumen.

He is also regarded as a pioneer in guerrilla warfare in the region. He is credited with carrying out a revenue settlement of much of the Deccan, which formed the basis for subsequent settlements. He is a figure of veneration to the Siddis of Gujarat. He challenged the might of the Mughals and Adil Shahs of Bijapur and raised the low status of the Nizam Shah.

== Early life ==
Malik Ambar was born in 1548 in Harar, Adal Sultanate. He was known as Chapu. Early sources claim he was from the now extinct Maya tribe. However historian Richard M. Eaton stated that Malik Ambar's "origin (is) in the Kambata region of southern Ethiopia". Eaton also wrote that "Kambata, the region from which Malik Ambar appears to have come" might have influenced the names of places such as "Cumbala Hill a quarter in modern Mumbai whose name is probably derived from Kambata."

Between the 14th and 17th centuries, the Orthodox Christian Ethiopian Empire (led by the Solomonic dynasty) and adjacent Muslim states gathered many of their slaves from non-Abrahamic communities inhabiting regions like Kambata, Damot and Hadya, which were located to the south of their territory. Chapu was among the people who were converted to Islam, and later dispatched abroad to serve as a warrior. According to the Futuhat-i `Adil Shahi, he was sold into slavery by his parents and ended up in al-Mukha in Yemen, where he was sold again for 20 ducats and was taken to the slave market in Baghdad. There he was sold a third time to the Qazi al-Qudat of Mecca and then to Mir Qasim al-Baghdadi. Qasim converted Chapu to Islam from his traditional religion, educated him, and gave him the name Ambar, after recognizing his superior intellectual qualities. He eventually took Ambar to the Deccan Plateau. He was described by the Dutch merchant, Pieter van den Broecke as "a black kafir from Abyssinia with a stern Roman face."

Ambar was then purchased by Changiz Khan, a former Habshi slave himself who served as the peshwa or chief minister of the Sultanate of Ahmadnagar.

== Political background ==
Muslim slaves known as habshi, were recruited in the Deccan since the rule of the Bahmani Sultanate, founded by North Indian Muslims known as the Deccanis. Slaves were generally recruited where hereditary authority was weak, such as in the case of the Deccan, where a deadly and violent struggle between the two dominant and antagonistic factions within the Bahmani Sultanate, the Deccanis (Indian Muslims) and the Westerners (Persian migrants from the Gulf), caused a chronically unstable environment which created a market for culturally alien military labor. The interdependent relationship between the Deccanis and the Habshis engendered bonds of mutual trust, as the Deccanis had both kin and inherited authority, but lacked sufficient numbers, while the Habshis were able to provide support while lacking kin and inherited authority. This explained why high ranking army commanders were willing to entrust their most important official duties to their Habshi slaves. As the Habshi slaves became freemen on the death of their masters, continuing the military careers as freelancers, they generally allied themselves politically and culturally with the Deccani class in their rivalry against the Persians, embracing the Deccani Muslim identity and language.

== Career ==
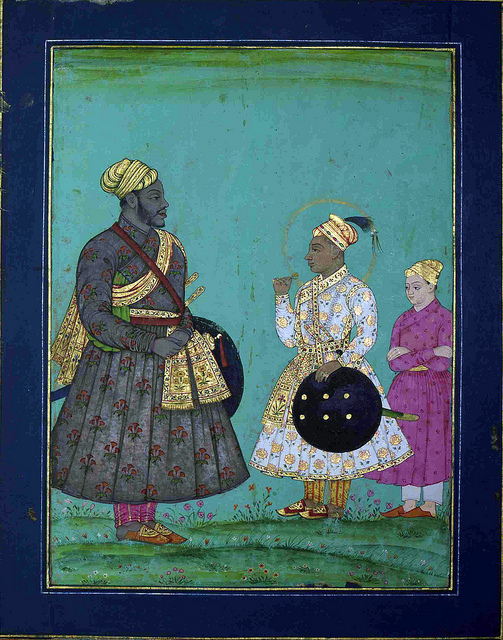
Malik Ambar and Murtaza Nizam Shah II

Once his master died, Malik Ambar was freed by his master's wife. He got married, and after getting freed, Ambar served the Sultan of Bijapur as an officer and gained the title "Malik" during this time. But Ambar quit this service in 1595 after citing insufficient support before entering service in the Nizam Shahi army.

Malik Ambar was the regent of the Nizamshahi dynasty of Ahmednagar from 1600 to 1626. During this period he increased the strength and power of Murtaza Nizam Shah II and raised a large army. He raised a cavalry which grew from 150 to 7000 in a short period of time and revitalized the Ahmadnagar sultanate by appointing puppet sultans to repel Mughal attacks from the North. By 1610, his army grew to include 10,000 Habshis and 40,000 Deccanis. Over the course of the next decade, Malik Ambar would fight and defeat Mughal emperor Jahangir's attempts to take over the kingdom. Jahangir considered Malik Ambar his arch-nemesis and had publicly expressed his anger towards him. He criticized Ambar as "the ill-starred" and "the black fated". Abu'l Hasan, a chief painter at Emperor Jahangir's court, has created a painting, under Jahangir's commission in 1615, depicting Jahangir shooting arrows at the severed head of Ambar.

Malik Ambar changed the capital of the Ahmadnagar Sultanate from Paranda to Junnar and founded a new city, Khadki, which was later on renamed to Aurangabad by Aurangzeb in the 1650s.

Malik Ambar is said to be one of the proponents of guerrilla warfare in the Deccan region. Malik Ambar assisted Shah Jahan wrestle power in Delhi from his stepmother, Nur Jahan, who had ambitions of seating her son-in-law on the throne. Malik Ambar had also restored some credibility to the Sultans of Ahmadnagar, who had been subdued by the earlier Mughals (Akbar had annexed Ahmadnagar). However, he was defeated later when Shah Jahan led a massive army against the dwindling Ahmednagar. Later Malik Ambar offered full control of Berar and Ahmadnagar to the Mughal as a sign of surrender.

=== Second conflict with Mughals ===
Malik Ambar defeated the Mughal General Khan Khanan many times and often attacked Ahmadnagar. Lakhuji Jadhavrao, Maloji Bhosale, Shahaji Bhosale, Ranoji Wable and other Maratha chiefs had gained great prominence during this period. With the help of these Maratha chiefs, Malik Ambar had captured Ahmednagar Fort and town from the Mughals. But in one of the battles Malik Ambar was defeated by the Mughals and had to surrender the fort of Ahmadnagar. Many Maratha Chiefs and especially Lakhuji Jadhavrao joined the Mughals after this. Shah Jahan once again laid a crushing blow to Malik Ambar in one of the battles and further decreased his power.

== Death ==
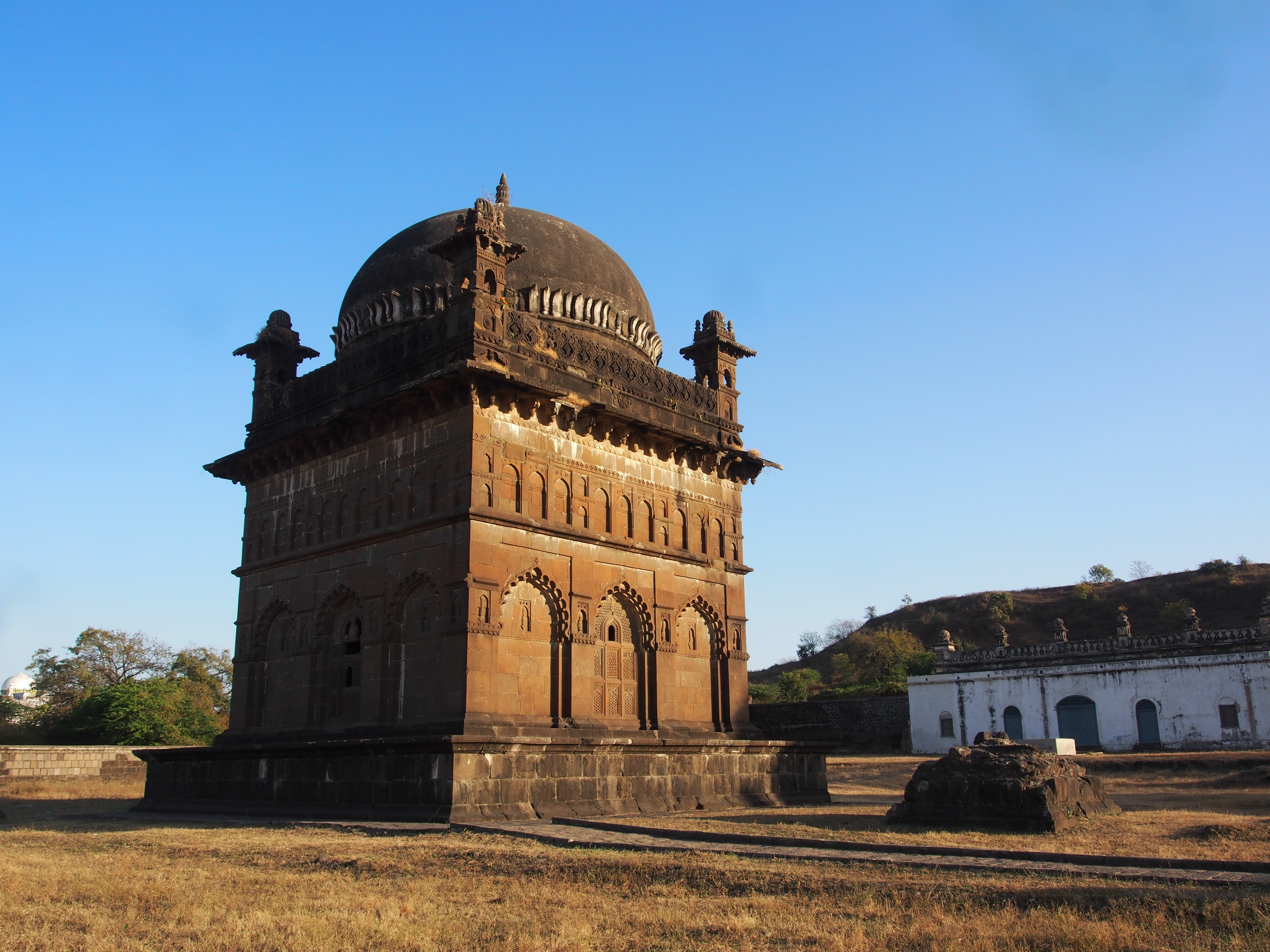
Malik Ambar's Tomb at Khuldabad in 2022

He died in a dual battle against a Dadhiwadiya Charan of Marwar in 1626 at the age of 77. Dadhiwadiya Kuldeep was a military commander of the ruler of Marwar who was given the task of eliminating Malik Ambar. Malik Ambar had by his wife, Bibi Karima two sons; Fateh Khan and Changiz Khan and two daughters.

Fateh Khan succeeded his father as the regent of the Nizam Shahs. However, he did not possess his predecessor's political and military prowess. Through a series of internal struggles within the nobility (which included Fateh Khan assassinating his nephew, Sultan Burhan Nizam Shah III), the sultanate fell to the Mughal Empire within ten years of Ambar's death.

One of his daughters was married to a prince of the Ahmednagar royal family, who through Malik Ambar's aid was crowned as Sultan Murtaza Nizam Shah II. The eldest and youngest daughters respectively were called Shahir Bano and Azija Bano, the latter of whom married a nobleman named Siddi Abdullah.

His youngest daughter was married to the Circassian Commander of the Ahmednagar army, Muqarrab Khan, who later became a general under the Mughal Emperor and received the title Rustam Khan Bahadur Firauz Jang. He became famous for his involvement in several important military campaigns, such as the Kandahar Wars against Shah Abbas of Persia. He was killed by Prince Murad Baksh in the Battle of Samugarh during the Mughal War of succession in 1658. Malik Ambar's tomb lies in Khuldabad, near the shrine of the famous Sufi saint Zar Zari Baksh.

Genealogy of Malik Ambar:

Malik Ambar r. 1600–1626
Fateh Khan r. 1626–1633	Yusuf	Changiz	Mansur
Abdul Rasul	Ali Ahmed
Ali	Rahman	Jabbar	Abdullah
Ibrahim	Husain	Jagna mian
Faiz	Abdul Rasul
Miran

== Legacy ==
There are conflicting perspectives on Ambar's long-term impact in Deccan, and its surrounding Indian states. Western historians have tried to project him as symbolic of Africa, even though his life had little to do with Africa. Others agree more with historians like Richard Eaton. He cites Ambar's military prowess as the reason he rose to such influence during his life, but claims that a string of decisive defeats at the end of his career instigated distrust and resentment amongst those in his close administration. Eaton and his proponents claim Ambar's journey is an impressive story of success, and gave Africans representation in India for a short while, but also believe his lack of positive leadership in the final years of his tenure prevented him from solidifying his influence, as his successors quickly worked to reverse many of Ambar's policies. Regardless of his posthumous impact on the Deccan, and Indian states generally, it cannot be disputed Ambar was an avid supporter of education and a patron of the arts. Historians Joseph E. Harris and Chand cite Ambar's patronship of the arts and learning as a shining achievement of his tenure as Malik of Deccan.

Malik Ambar cherished strong love and ability for architecture. Aurangabad was Ambar's architectural achievement and creation. Malik Ambar the founder of the city was always referred to by harsh names by Sultan Jahangir. In his memoirs, he never mentions his name without prefixing epithets like wretch, cursed fellow, Habshi, Ambar Siyari, black Ambar, and Ambar Badakhtur. Some historians believe that those words came out of frustration as Malik Ambar had resisted the powerful Mughals and kept them away from Deccan.

=== Foundation of Khirki ===
He founded/inhabited the city of Khirki in 1610. After his death in 1626, the name was changed to Fatehpur by his son and heir Fateh Khan. When Aurangzeb, the Mughal Emperor invaded Deccan in the year 1653, he made Fatehpur his capital and renamed it as Aurangabad. Two former imperial capitals – Pratisthana, the capital of Satavahanas (2nd BC to 3rd AD), and Devagiri, the capital of Yadavas and Muhammad bin Tughluq, are located within the limits of Aurangabad District.

=== Aurangabad canal system ===
Malik Ambar is especially famous for the Neher water system of the city of Khadki (modern Aurangabad). Malik Ambar completed the Neher within fifteen months, spending a nominal sum of two and a half lakh Rupiyahs. This city is situated on the banks of the Kham, a small perennial stream which rises in the neighbouring hills.

Water was supplied to the city from the famous Panchakki water mill which drove the water down the canal from the Kham. The blades of the Panchakki used to rotate by the water falling on them from that stream and with the aid of a wooden valve turn the flow into that canal for the city.

The canal was an impressive engineering feat as it consisted of a 7 feet (2.1 m) deep tunnel large enough for a man to walk through. The canal had 140 manholes and it worked efficiently without the need for any maintenance or cleaning for 321 years until it finally needed cleaning in 1931.

== Janjira Fort ==
Malik Ambar is credited with the construction of the Janjira Fort in the Murud Area of present-day Maharashtra India. After its construction in 1567, the fort was key to the Sidis withstanding various invasion attempts by the Marathas, Mughals, and Portuguese to capture Janjira.

== See also ==
- Neher water system
