= Ataullah =

- Pronunciation: Arabic: [ʕatˤaː.ɑɫɫɑh]
- Gender: Male
- Language: Arabic

Origin
- Origin: Arabic
- Meaning: Gift of Allah, (Allah) God's return
- Region of origin: Middle East

Other names
- Alternative spelling: Attaalla, Atallah
- Variant forms: Ataollah (Iranian), Odtallah or Odetallah (Palestinian)
- Related names: Ata; Theodore

Ataullah (Arabic: عطاء الله or عطا الله) or the alternative spellings Atallah or Attalah is an Arabic given name meaning "gift of God", composed of Ata (gift) + Allah (God). It is also a surname to Middle Eastern Christians. The Iranian variant of the same name is Ataollah.

Odtallah or Odetallah (Arabic: عودة الله) is a Palestinian last name where it comes from the personal name meaning "Return of God" made up of the words (Odta) ("Return") + (Allah) ("God").

== Persons ==
=== Given name ===
- Sultan Ataullah Muhammad Shah I (1422–1472), Sultan of Kedah
- Sultan Ataullah Muhammad Shah II (1687–1698), Sultan of Kedah
- Ataullah Rashidi, 17th century architect from Mughal Empire of present-day India
- Attallah Suheimat (1875–1965), Jordanian politician
- Syed Ata Ullah Shah Bukhari (1892–1961), Indian religious and political leader
- Qazi Ataullah Khan (1895–1952), Pakistani politician
- Ataollah Khosravani (1919–2005), Iranian politician
- Ataullah Mengal (1929–2021), Chief Minister of Balochistan, Pakistan
- Ataullah Hafezzi (1948–2025), Bangladeshi Islamist leader and politician
- Ataullah Bogdan Kopański (born 1948), Polish-born historian
- Ataollah Salehi (born 1950), commander-in-chief of the Iranian Army
- Attaullah Khan Esakhelvi (born 1951), Pakistani folk singer
- Ata'ollah Mohajerani (born 1964), Iranian historian, politician, journalist, and author
- Ataullah Guerra (born 1987), Trinidadian footballer
- Ataullah (cricketer), (born 1986) Pakistani cricketer
- Attaullah (Afghan cricketer) (born 1990), Afghan cricketer
- Ataullah abu Ammar Jununi, leader of the Arakan Rohingya Salvation Army
- Ataollah Zahed (1915–1991), Iranian actor, film director, film produce, screenplay writer, educator, and a voice-over actor.
- Ataollah Ashrafi Esfahani (1902–1982), Iranian Shia cleric
- Atallah Hanna (b. 1965), the colloquial name of Palestinian Archbishop Theodosius of Sebastia
- Ataullah Khan (died 1975), Indian film producer

=== Middle name ===
- Salah al-Din Attallah Suheimat, or just Salah Suheimat (1914–1966), Jordanian politician
- Muhammad Atta-ullah Faizani (1923–?), Afghan Muslim scholar

=== Family name ===
- Naim Attallah (1931–2021), Palestinian businessman and writer
- Samir Atallah (born 1941), Lebanese journalist, author and political analyst
- Elias Atallah (born 1947), Lebanese politician
- Alain Attalah (born 1964), Egyptian basketball player
- Christine Atallah (1965–2011), Canadian singer-songwriter
- Nasri Atallah (born 1982), Lebanese-British author
- Bassel Atallah, Firas Atallah and Rami Atallah, Syrian Canadian businessmen, co-founders of SSENSE
- Mikhail Atallah, Lebanese-American computer scientist
- Zeb Ataullah, known professionally as Chanchal (born 1934), Indian actress

== See also ==
- Atala (disambiguation)
- Theodore (given name)
