= Ibn Ata =

Ibn Ata is an Arabic patronomyic, meaning son of Ata. It may refer to the following individuals:

- Ibn Ata Allah al-Iskandari (1259–1310), Egyptian jurist, hadith collector, and teacher
- Abu al-Abbas al-Mursi (1219–1287), Andalusian Sufi saint
- Wasil ibn Ata (699–748), Muslim theologian and jurist

== See also ==
- Ata ibn Abi Rabah (c. 646–c. 733), Muslim jurist and hadith transmitter
