= Shah Kalim Allah Jahanabadi =

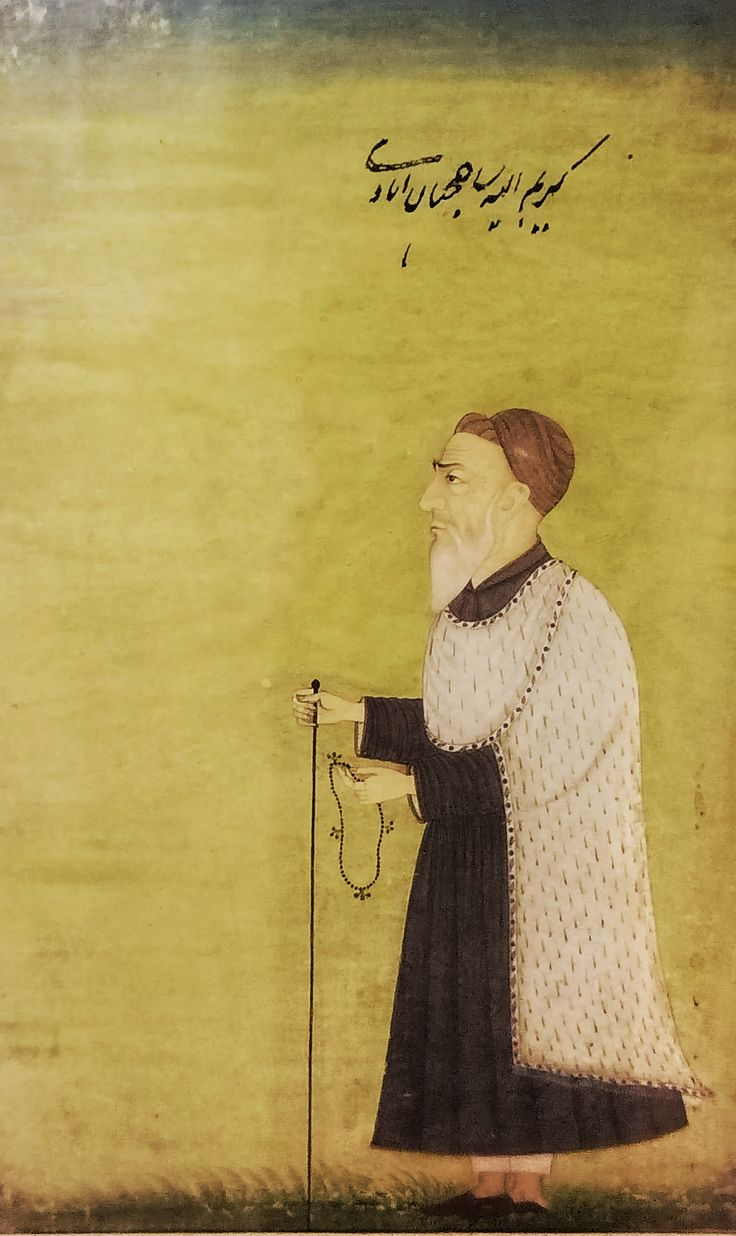
- Painting of Hazrat Karimulla Shahjahanabadi, Mughal School, circa 18th century
- Title: "SHEIKH E AZAM"

Personal life
- Born: 1650 Delhi, Mughal India
- Died: 1729 (aged 78–79) Delhi, Mughal India
- Spouse: Qudsia Akhtar Banu Suhrawardiyya
- Parent: Noor Ullah b.Ustad Ahmed Muamar (father)

Religious life
- Religion: Islam
- Sect: Sufi Chishti Order

Muslim leader
- Based in: Delhi, India
- Predecessor: Shaikh Yahiya Mandi

Khwaja Shāh Kalīm-Ullāh Jahānābādī (شاه كليم الله جهانابادي) b. Nūr Allāh b. Aḥmad al-Miʿmār al-Ṣiddīqī (1650-1729) was a leading Chistī saint of the late Mughal period and is considered to be instrumental in the revival of the Chistī Order and Mir Sayyid Ali Hamadani ṣūfī ṭarīqah (path). His father, Noor Ullah, was a well-known astronomer and calligraphist. He was the grandson of Ustād Aḥmad Lahorī, the architect of the Taj Mahal and Lal Qila.

== Legacy ==
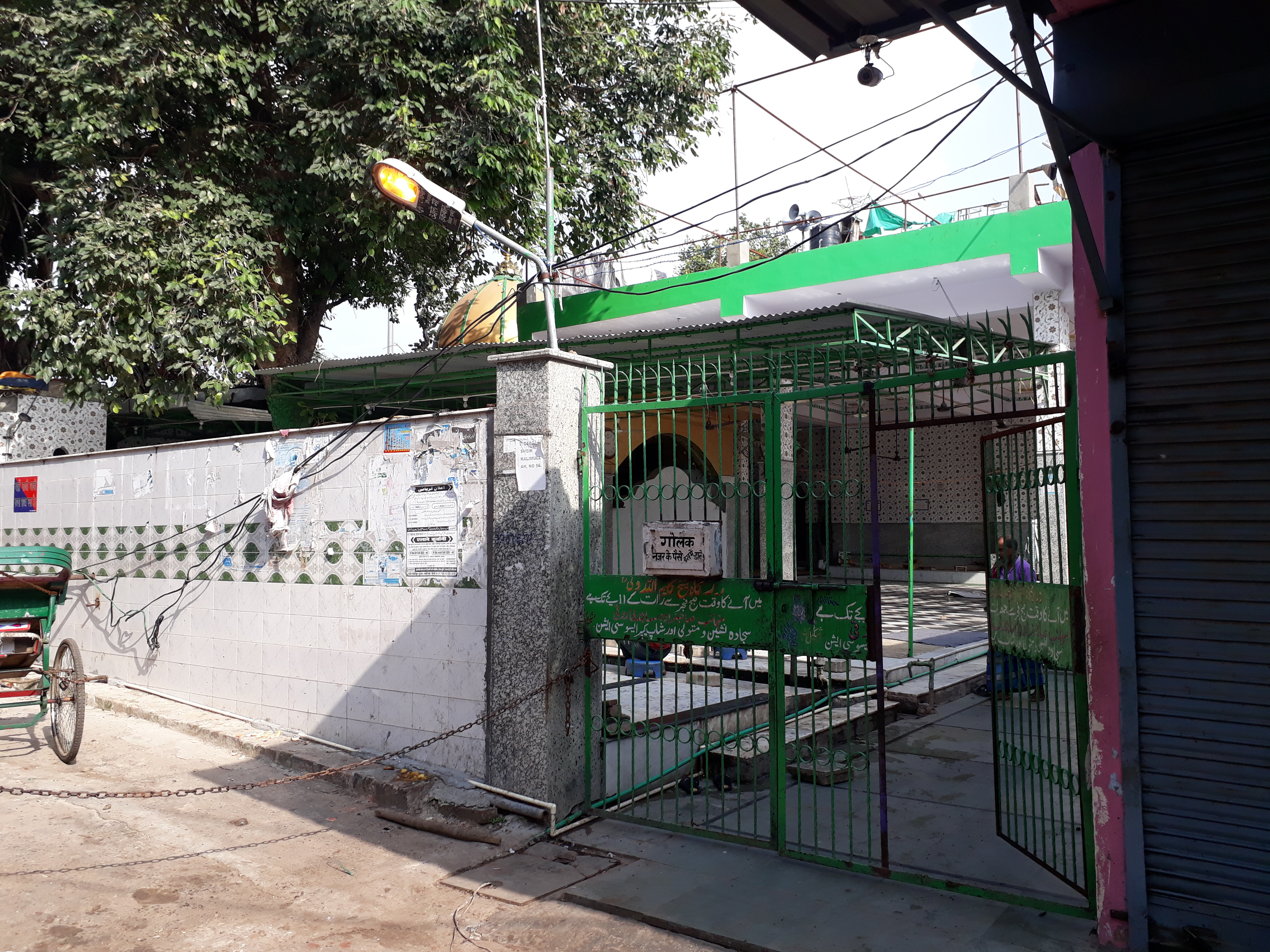
The shrine of Kaleem Ullah Shah Jahanabadi beside the Meena Bazaar, Old Delhi

Among his successors are Syed Shah Yousufain and Syed Shah Sharifuddin.

In the popular discourses of modern India he is remembered for his inclusivist approach to Hindus. The shrine of Kaleem Ullah Shah is situated opposite of the Red Fort, beside the Meena Bazaar, Old Delhi.

== Notable works ==
- Tilka ʿAsharat Kāmilah
- Kashkūl Kalīmī
- Maktūbāt-i Kalīmī
- Muraqqā Kalimi
- Sawa alssabeel e kaleemi
