= Ata (name) =

- Pronunciation: Tswana pronunciation: [ʔaːta] Arabic pronunciation: [ʕatˤaː] Persian pronunciation: [ʔætɒː] Turkish pronunciation: [ˈata] Hebrew pronunciation: [ʕata]
- Gender: Male

Origin
- Origin: Old Turkic, Arabic, Hebrew, Fante
- Meaning: increase in Tswana; forefather in Turkic; Gift in Arabic; one of the twins in Fante;
- Region of origin: Southeastern Europe, Asia Minor; Middle East; Southern Africa; Western Africa.

Other names
- Alternative spelling: ‘Aṭā, `Ata, 'Ata, Atta, & Ataa in Arabic; Ataa in Fante
- Derived: from Old Turkic ata, "father"
- Related names: Atang, Kato, Atiyah, Ataullah, and Ata-ur-Rahman in Arabic; Agata, Aminata, and Barbata in Fante; Atahan, Atakan, Atagün in Turkish

Ata is the anglicized form of several names in several languages around the world.

- In Tswana, Ata means “increase”.
- In Turkish, Ata is a masculine given name meaning "Forefather".
- In Hebrew, Ata (אתה) means "you".
- In Ogba, Ata means “child” and can also mean Father and King. This if often based on context and root.
- In Arabic, ‘Aṭā (عطا) is a name meaning "Gift". It also appears in Persian (عطا).
- In Fante, Ata means "one of twins".

Ata, Atta, or Ataa may refer more specifically to:

Ata is the anglicized form of several unrelated personal names and lexical terms that appear independently in multiple languages and cultures worldwide. Despite similarities in spelling and pronunciation, these forms generally arise from distinct linguistic roots and do not share a single common etymology.

== Overview ==
The term Ata functions both as a given name and as a common word in various languages. In some contexts it denotes kinship, authority, or ancestry; in others it conveys abstract meanings such as time of day, goodness, or grammatical function. The recurrence of the form across cultures is widely regarded as coincidental rather than evidence of historical connection.

== Ata as a personal name ==
=== Africa ===
- Igala (Nigeria): Àtá is a royal title meaning "king" or "father" and is borne by the paramount ruler of the Igala Kingdom.
- Fante (Ghana): Ata is a traditional personal name given to one of a pair of twins.
- Ogba (Nigeria, Rivers State): Ata is used as a personal name meaning "child," and has the meaning same as Igala where the name was drived. Àtá often spelt Attah, Atta and Atà can also mean Father, King and Leader.
- Obolo (Nigeria, Rivers State): Ata may appear as a name derived from a word meaning "good" or "well".

=== Middle East and Central / South Asia ===
- Arabic: عطاء (ʿAṭāʾ) is a masculine given name meaning "gift" or "bestowal" and is widely used across the Middle East and North Africa.
- Persian: عطا (Aṭā) is used as a personal name with the meaning "gift".
- Aramaic: Forms derived from the verbal root אתא (ʾatā, "to come") appear in historical and religious texts and occasionally as names or name elements.

=== Turkic cultures ===
- Turkish: Ata means "ancestor" or "forefather" and is used both as a given name and as an honorific element, most notably in the surname Atatürk ("Father of the Turks").

=== Oceania ===
- Māori (New Zealand): Ata appears in personal and place names and is associated with meanings related to morning or dawn.
- Tongan and Samoan: Ata may be used as a personal name derived from words meaning "dawn" or "morning".

== Ata as a lexical term ==
=== Polynesian languages ===
In Polynesian languages such as Samoan and Tongan, ata is associated with meanings including "dawn", "morning", "light", and in some contexts "shadow" or "reflection".

=== Māori ===
In the Māori language of Aotearoa (New Zealand), ata commonly means "morning", "dawn", or "daybreak". It also appears in greetings such as ata mārie ("good morning") and can denote reflection or likeness depending on context.

=== Obolo ===
In 'Obolo, spoken by the Andoni (Obolo) people of southern Nigeria, ata functions as a lexical item conveying the meaning "good" or "well" in certain constructions.

=== Aramaic ===
In 'Aramaic, אתא (ʾatā) is a verb meaning "he came" or "to come". It is attested in Biblical Aramaic and later Jewish Aramaic literature, including the Talmud.

=== Hebrew ===
In 'Hebrew, אתה (ata or atah) is a second‑person masculine singular pronoun meaning "you". While orthographically similar, it is linguistically unrelated to most other uses of Ata.

=== Téenek (Huastec) ===
In Téenek, a Mayan language spoken in the La Huasteca region of Mexico, atā is associated with the meanings "house" or "home".

=== Tswana ===
In 'Tswana, spoken in Botswana and South Africa, ata may function as a verb meaning "to increase".

== First element of compound name ==
- Ataullah, Arabic, meaning gift of God
- Ata-ur-Rahman, Arabic, meaning gift of the Most Merciful

== Given name ==
=== Turkish ===
- Ata Bozaci (born 1974), Swiss graphic designer, illustrator and artist of Turkish descent
- Ata Demirer (born 1972), Turkish stand-up comedian and actor

=== Hungarian ===
- Ata Kandó (1913–2017), Hungarian photographer

=== Arabic ===
- Ata Abu Rashta (born 1943), Islamic jurist, scholar and writer
- Ata al-Ayyubi (1877–1951), Ottoman-Arab civil servant
- Ata ibn Abi Rabah, (c. 646 – c. 733) early Muslim jurist and hadith transmitter
- Ataa Jaber (born 1993), Palestinian footballer
- Ata-Malik Juvayni (1226–1283), Iranian historian
- Atta Muhammad Nur (born 1965), Afghan governor
- Ata Nahai (born 1960), Kurdish Iranian novelist
- Ata Yamrali (born 1982), German-Afghan footballer

=== Fante ===
- Ataa Oko (1919–2012), Ghanaian sculptor and artist

== Surname ==
=== Turkish ===
- Üsküplü Ata (died after 1533), Ottoman poet
- Mustafa Kemal Atatürk (1881–1938), Turkish military leader and statesman, founder of Turkiye. Atatürk was an honorary name.
- Ayla Akat Ata (born 1976), Turkish politician of Kurdish descent

=== Arabic ===
- Wasil ibn Ata (700–748), Islamic scholar
- Rahil Ata (1826–1894), Lebanese teacher and translator
- Mahmoud Mahmoud Atta (born 1954), American-Arab militant
- Shahla Ata (1959–2015), Afghan politician and congresswoman
- Mohamed Atta (1968–2001), Egyptian terrorist, ringleader of the September 11 attacks, hijacker-pilot of American Airlines Flight 11
- Walid Atta (born 1986), Swedish footballer

== Common name ==
- Ata is the commonly-abbreviated name for the Atacama skeleton, the six-inch long remains of a human with major genetic abnormalities that was discovered in 2003
