= Bibi Ka Maqbara =

Mausoleum in Chhatrapati Sambhajinagar

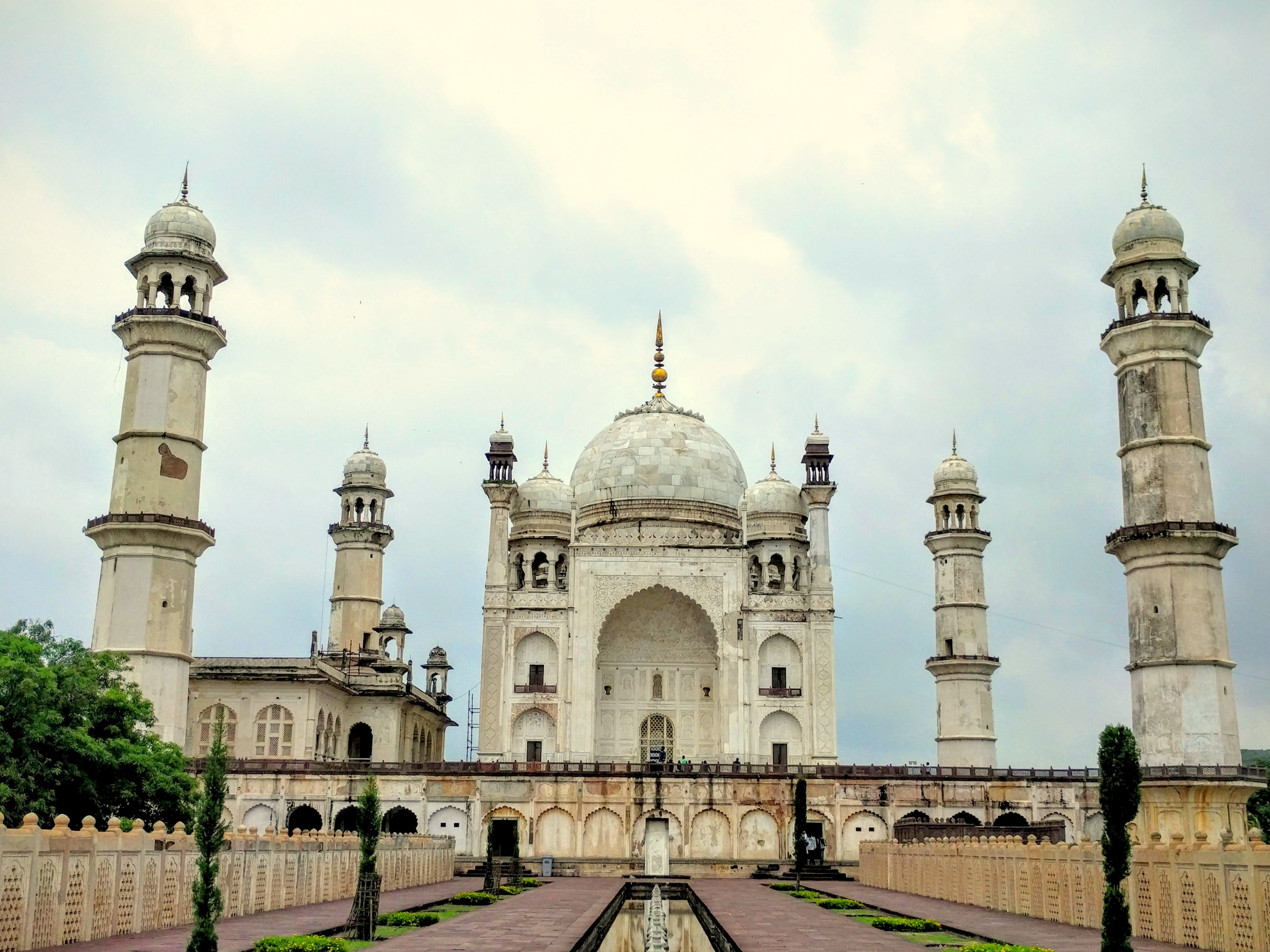

- Location in Maharashtra, India Bibi Ka Maqbara (India)
- 19.90151°N 75.320195°E
- Location: Chhatrapati Sambhajinagar (formerly Aurangabad), Maharashtra, India

History
- Founder: Azam Shah (Son of Aurangzeb, grandson of Shah Jahan)
- Built: 1668 (358 years ago)
- Built for: Dilras Banu Begum

Site notes
- Architect(s): Ata-ullah, Hanspat Rai
- Architectural style: Mughal architecture

The Bibi Ka Makbara (lit. 'Tomb of the Lady') is a tomb located in the city of Aurangabad in the Indian state of Maharashtra. It was commissioned in 1660 by the Mughal emperor Aurangzeb's son, Prince Azam Shah, in the memory of his mother Dilras Banu Begum (posthumously known as Rabia-ul-Durrani). It bears a striking resemblance to the Taj Mahal, the mausoleum of Aurangzeb's mother, Mumtaz Mahal, which is why it is also called the Taj of the Deccan or the Dakkhani Taj. Bibi Ka Maqbara is the second largest structure built by Aurangzeb, the largest being the Badshahi Mosque. The monument is currently maintained by the Archaeological Survey of India.

It has often been compared to the Taj Mahal, which Bamber Gascoigne argues "has often obscured its own very considerable charm". Bibi Ka Maqbara is the "principal monument" of Aurangabad and its historic city. An inscription found on the main entrance door mentions that this mausoleum was designed and erected by Ataullah Rashidi, an architect and Hanspat Rai, an engineer respectively. Ata-ullah was the son of Ustad Ahmad Lahori, the principal designer of the Taj Mahal. Aurangzeb's son, Muhammad Azam Shah was in later years put in charge of overseeing the repair-work of the mausoleum by Shah Jahan.

== History ==
Dilras Banu Begum was born a princess of the prominent Safavid dynasty of Iran (Persia) and was the daughter of Mirza Badi-uz-Zaman Safavi (titled Shahnawaz Khan), who was the viceroy of Gujarat. She married Prince Muhi-ud-din (later known as Aurangzeb upon his accession) on 8 May 1637 in Agra. Dilras was his first wife and chief consort, as well as his favourite. They had five children – Zeb-un-Nissa, Zinat-un-Nissa Begum, Zubdat-un-Nissa Begum, Muhammad Azam Shah and Muhammad Akbar.

After giving birth to her fifth child, Muhammad Akbar, Dilras Banu Begum possibly suffered from puerperal fever, due to complications caused by the delivery and died a month after the birth of her son on 8 October 1657. Upon her death, Aurangzeb's pain was extreme and their eldest son, Azam Shah, was so grieved that he had a nervous breakdown. It became Dilras' eldest daughter, Princess Zeb-un-Nissa's responsibility to take charge of her newborn brother. Zeb-un-Nissa doted on her brother a lot, and at the same time, Aurangzeb greatly indulged his motherless son and the prince soon became his best-loved son.

In 1660, Aurangzeb commissioned a mausoleum at Aurangabad to act as Dilras' final resting place, known as Bibi Ka Maqbara ("Tomb of the Lady"). Here, Dilras was buried under the posthumous title of 'Rabia-ud-Daurani' ("Rabia of the Age"). In the following years, her tomb was repaired by her son Azam Shah under Aurangzeb's orders. Bibi Ka Maqbara was the largest structure that Aurangzeb had to his credit and bears a striking resemblance to the Taj Mahal, the mausoleum of Dilras' mother-in-law, Empress Mumtaz Mahal, who herself died in childbirth. Aurangzeb, himself, is buried a few kilometres away from her mausoleum in Khuldabad.

=== Construction ===
Bibi Ka Maqbara is believed to have been built between 1668 and 1669 C.E. According to the "Tarikh Namah" of Ghulam Mustafa, the cost of construction of the mausoleum was Rs. 668,203-7 (rupees six lakh, sixty-eight thousand, two hundred three and seven annas) – Aurangzeb allocated only Rs. 700,000 for its construction. An inscription found on the main entrance door mentions that this mausoleum was designed and erected by Ataullah Rashidi, an architect and Hanspat Rai, an engineer, respectively. The marble for this mausoleum was brought from mines near Jaipur. According to Jean-Baptiste Tavernier, around three hundred carts laden with marble, drawn by at least 12 oxen, were seen by him during his journey from Surat to Golconda. The mausoleum was intended to rival the Taj Mahal, but the decline in architecture and proportions of the structure (both due to the severe budgetary constraints imposed by Aurangzeb) had resulted in a different and particular monument with its own significant beauty.

== Features ==
Mughal architecture

Outer gate of Bibi Ka Maqbara

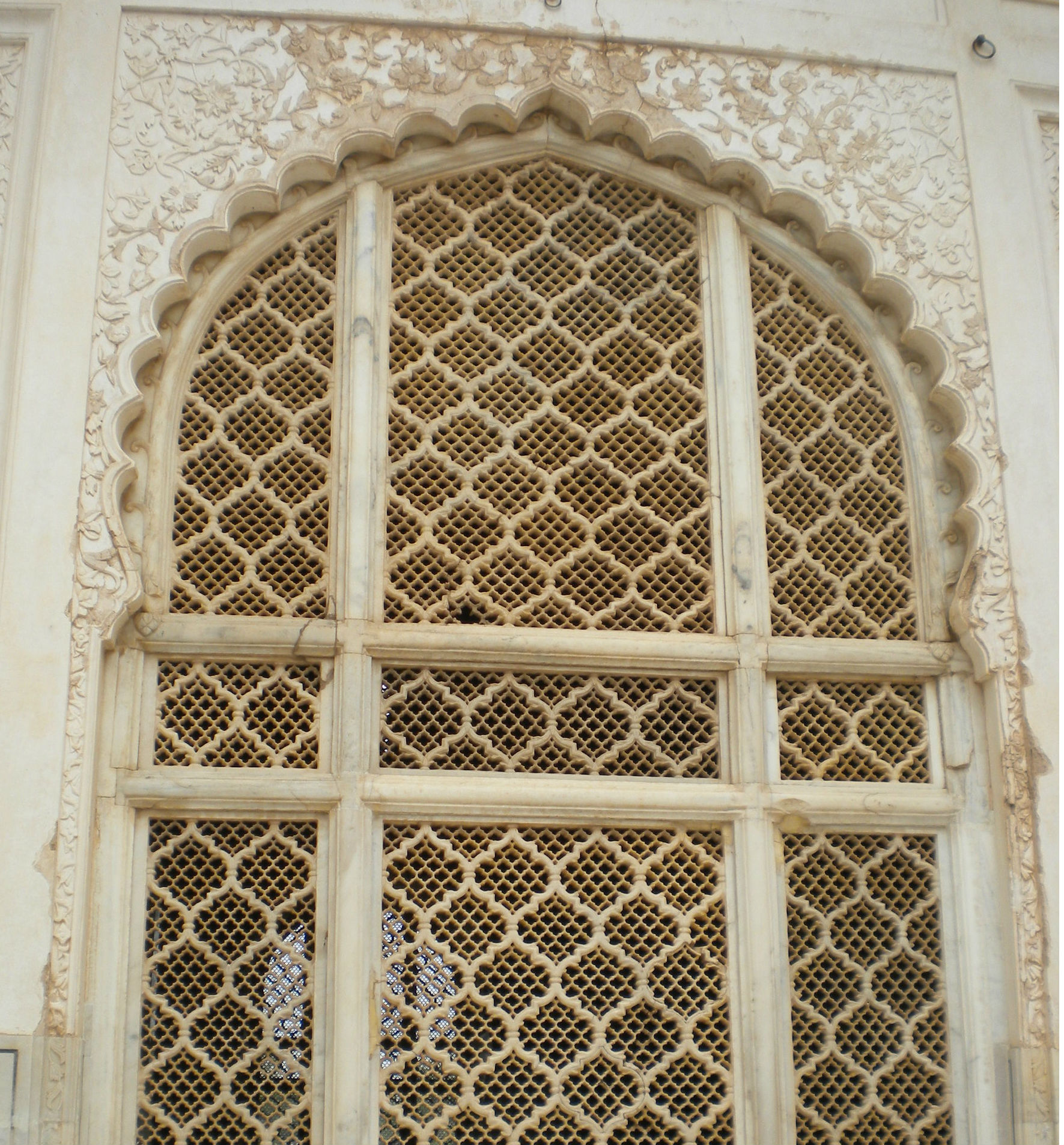
Jali work on the mosque

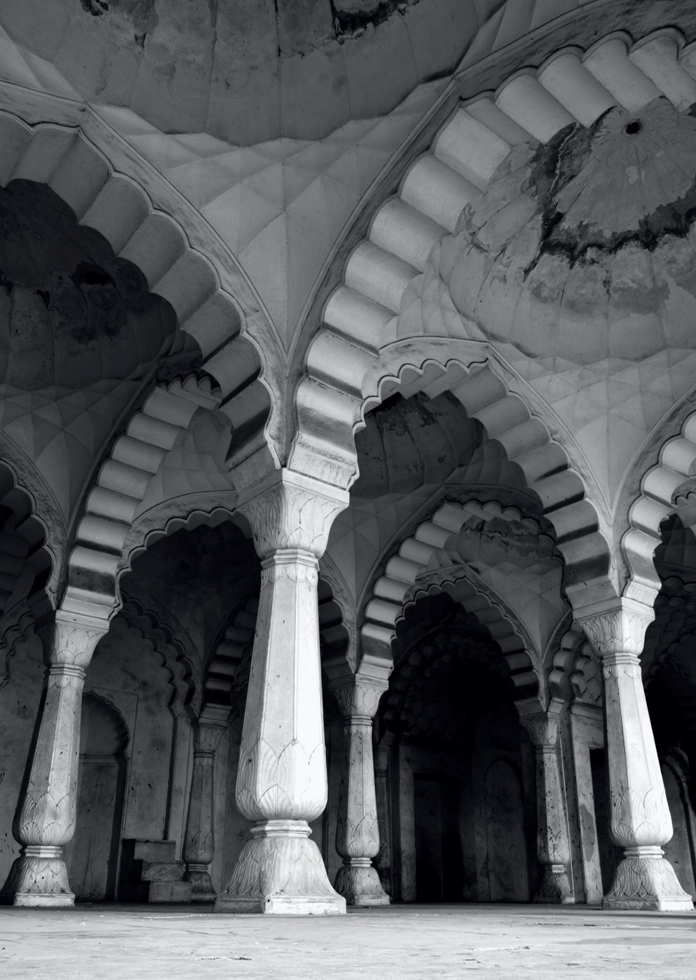
Arches inside the tomb

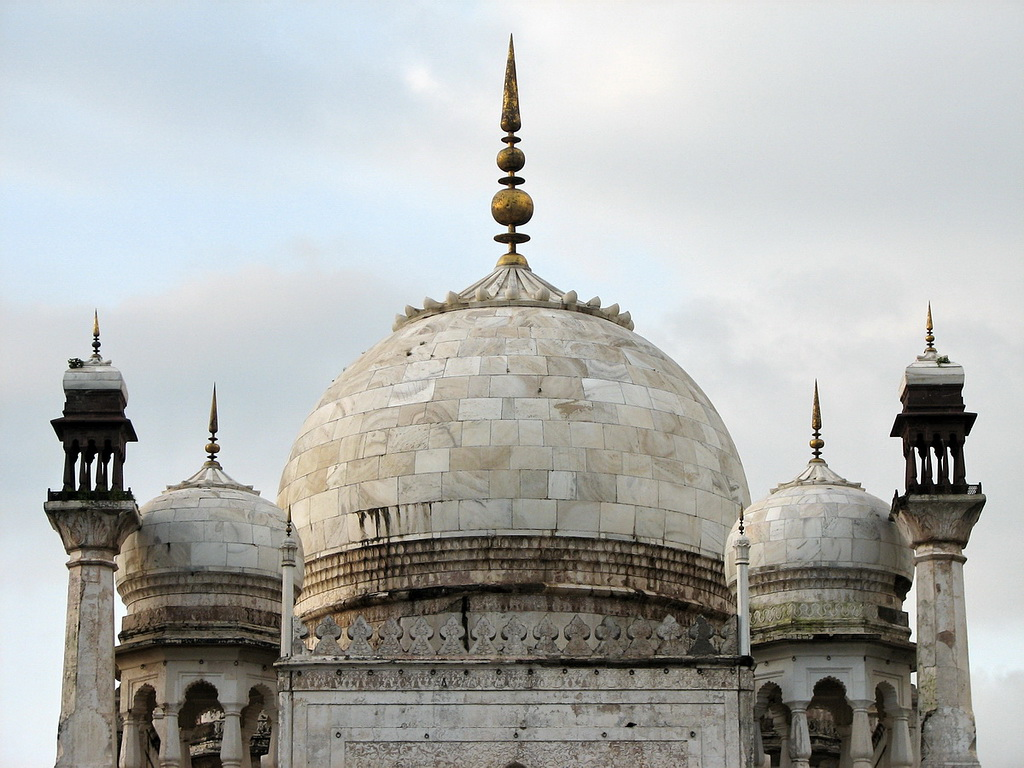
The view of tomb in clear skies

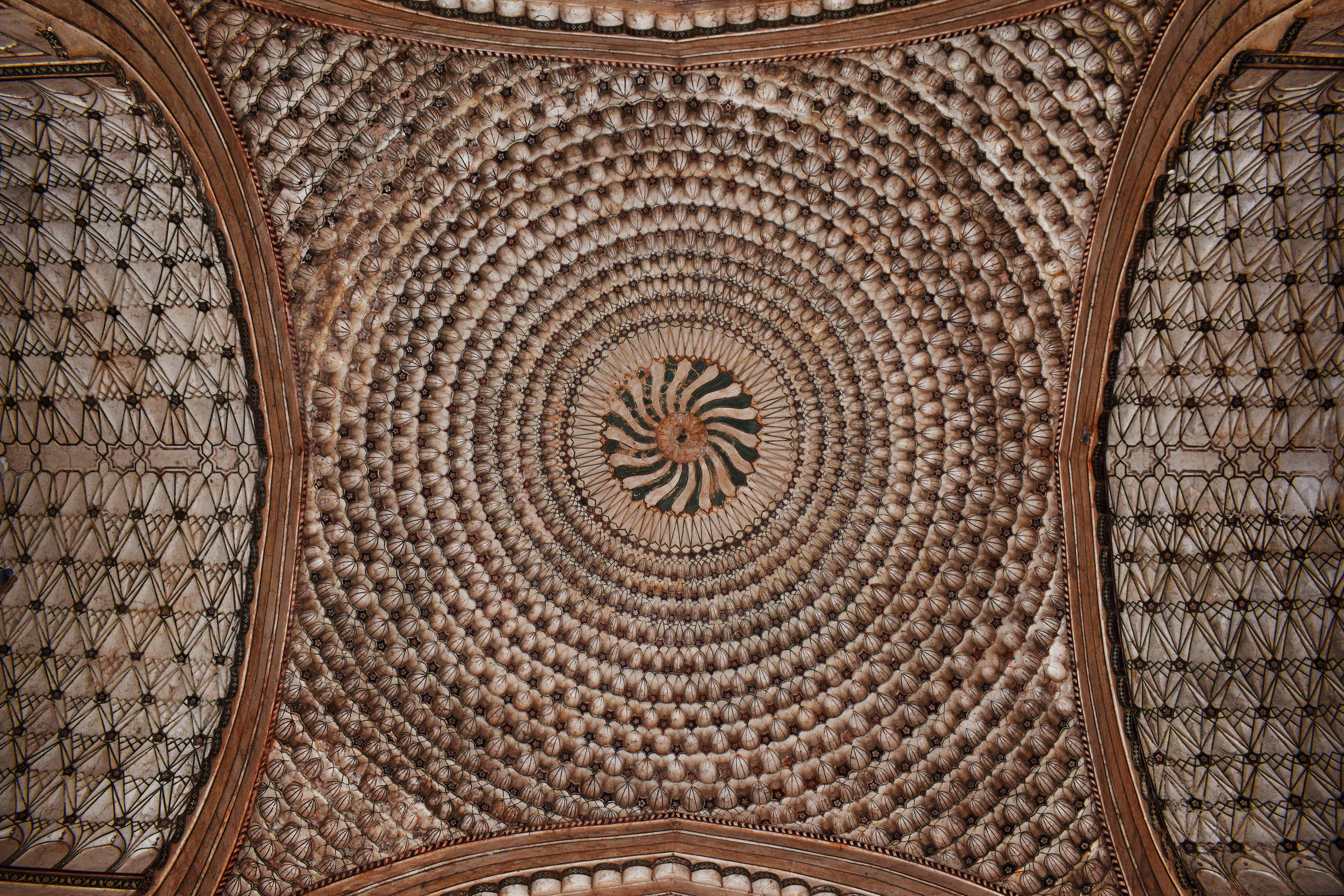
Designs on the interior of the dome

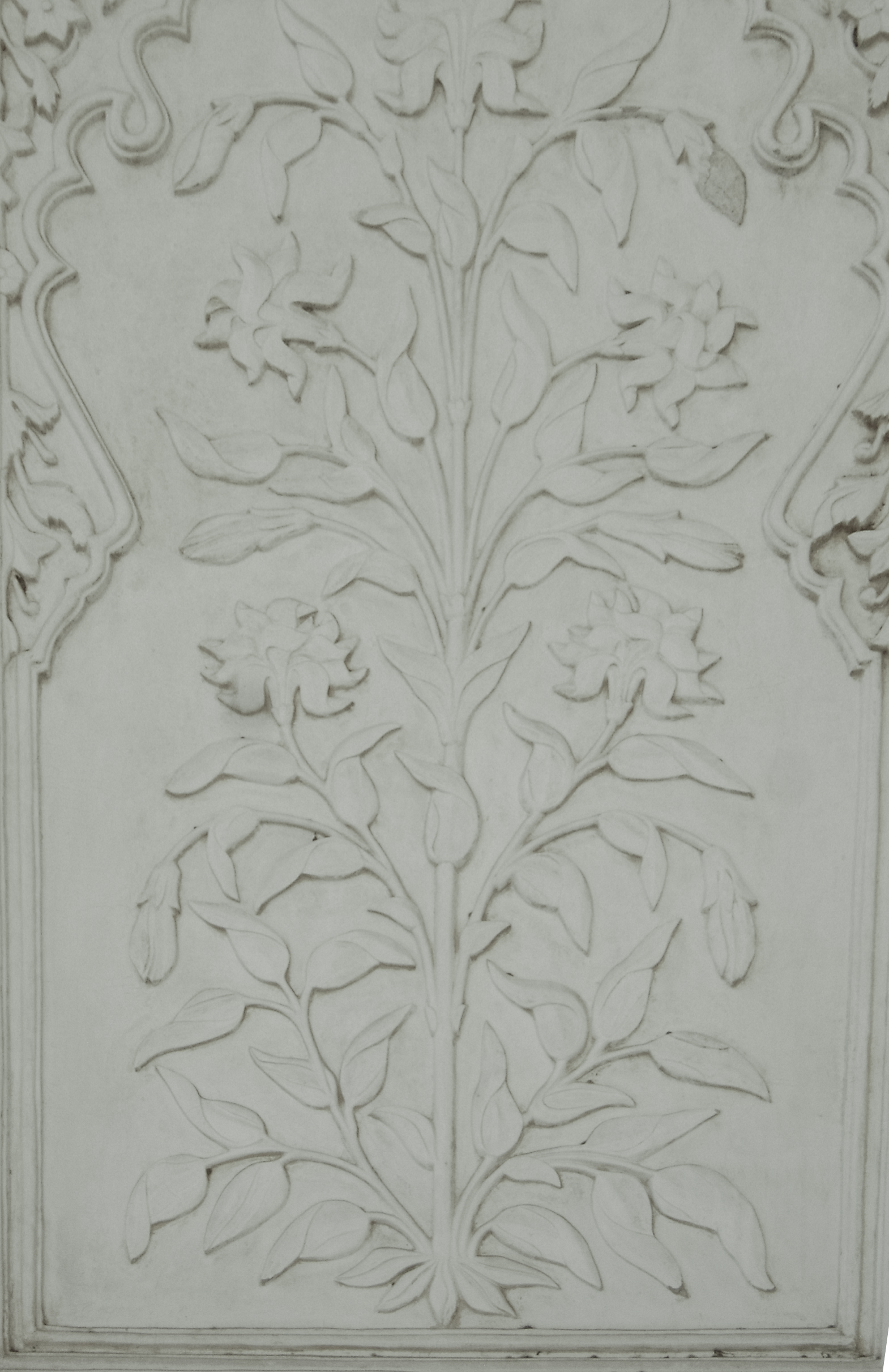
Floral designs on marble

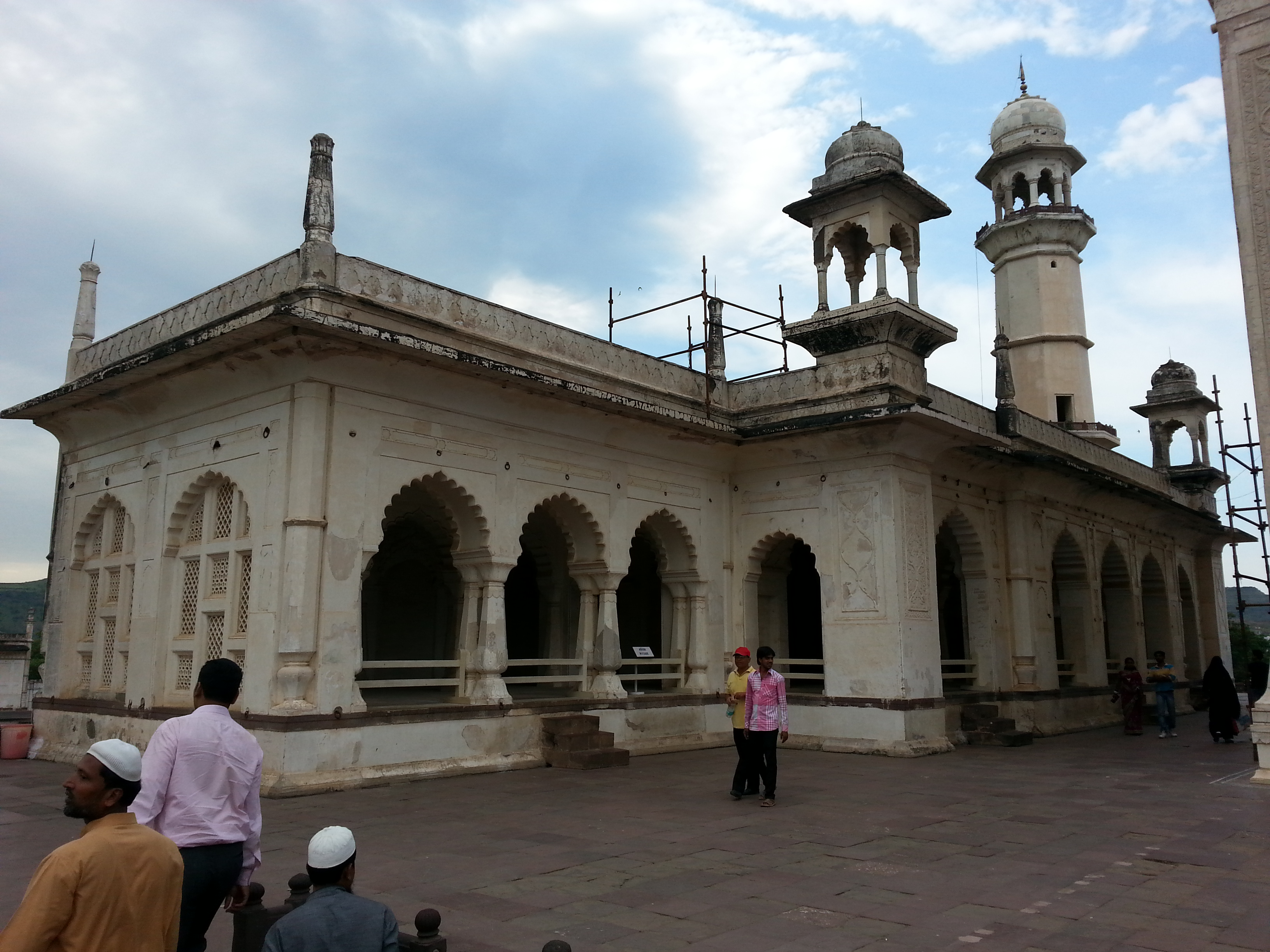
Side view of the mosque in the Mausoleum complex

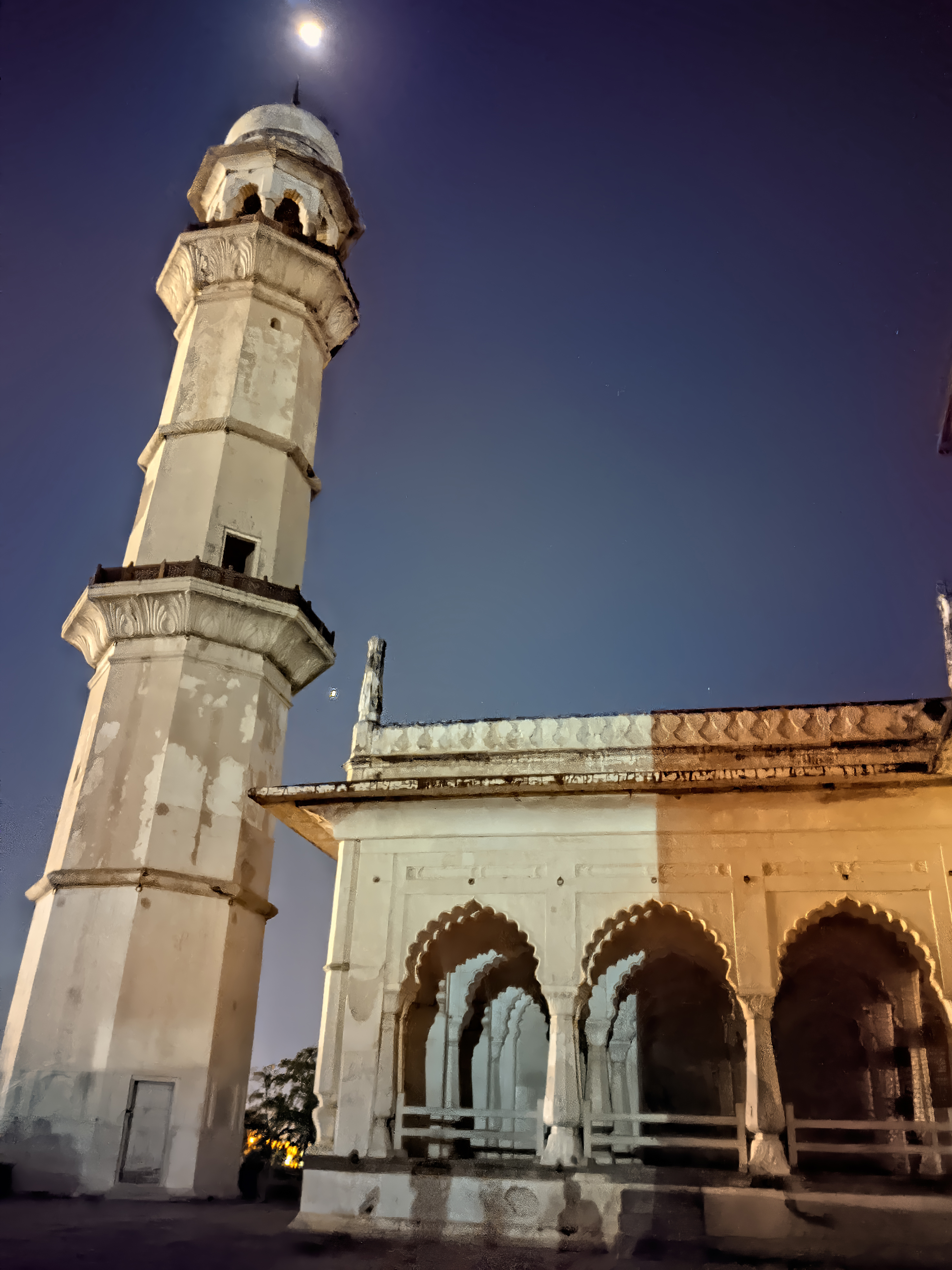
Night view of the Minaret

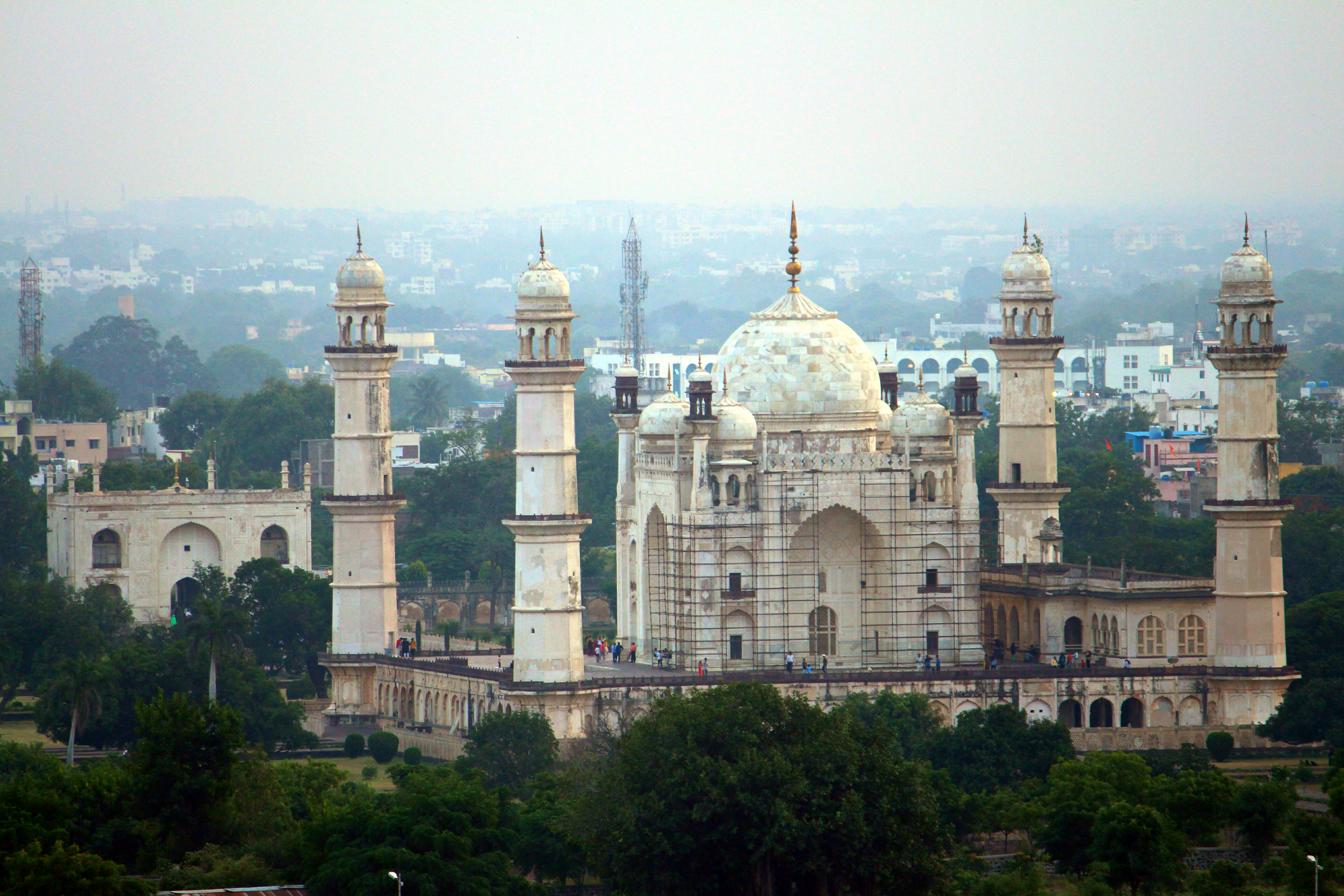
Aerial view of the tomb.

The mausoleum is laid out in a charbagh formal garden. It stands at the centre of a huge enclosure measuring approximately 458 m. N–S X 275 m. E-W. Baradaris or pillared pavilions are located at the center of the north, east, and western parts of the enclosure wall. The high enclosure wall is crenellated with pointed arched recesses and bastions at regular intervals. The recesses are divided by pilasters, crowned with small minarets. The mausoleum is built on a high square platform with four minarets at its corners, which is approached by a flight of steps from three sides. A mosque is found to the west of the main structure, a later addition by the Nizam of Hyderabad, resulting in the closure of the west entrance.

Entry to the mausoleum is through a main entrance gate on its south, which has foliage designs on brass plate on wood covering from the exterior. After passing through the entrance a small tank is provided and a low-profile screen wall leads to the main structure. The screened pathway has a series of fountains at its center.

The mausoleum is encased with marble up to the dado level. Above the dado level, it is constructed of basaltic trap up to the base of the dome; the latter is again built of marble. A fine plaster covers the basaltic trap and given a fine polished finish and adorned with fine stucco decorations. The mortal remains of Rabia Daurani are placed below the ground level surrounded by an octagonal jali pierced marble screen with exquisite designs, which can be approached by a descending flight of steps. The roof of this chamber that corresponds to the ground level of the mausoleum is pierced by an octagonal opening and given a low barricaded marble screen. This makes the tomb viewable from the ground level through this octagonal opening. The mausoleum is crowned by a dome pierced with trellis works and accompanying panels decorated with flower designs. The structure is in the form of a hexagon, its angles ornamented with minarets.

== Gallery ==
One of the illuminated minarets of Bibi Ka Maqbara at night

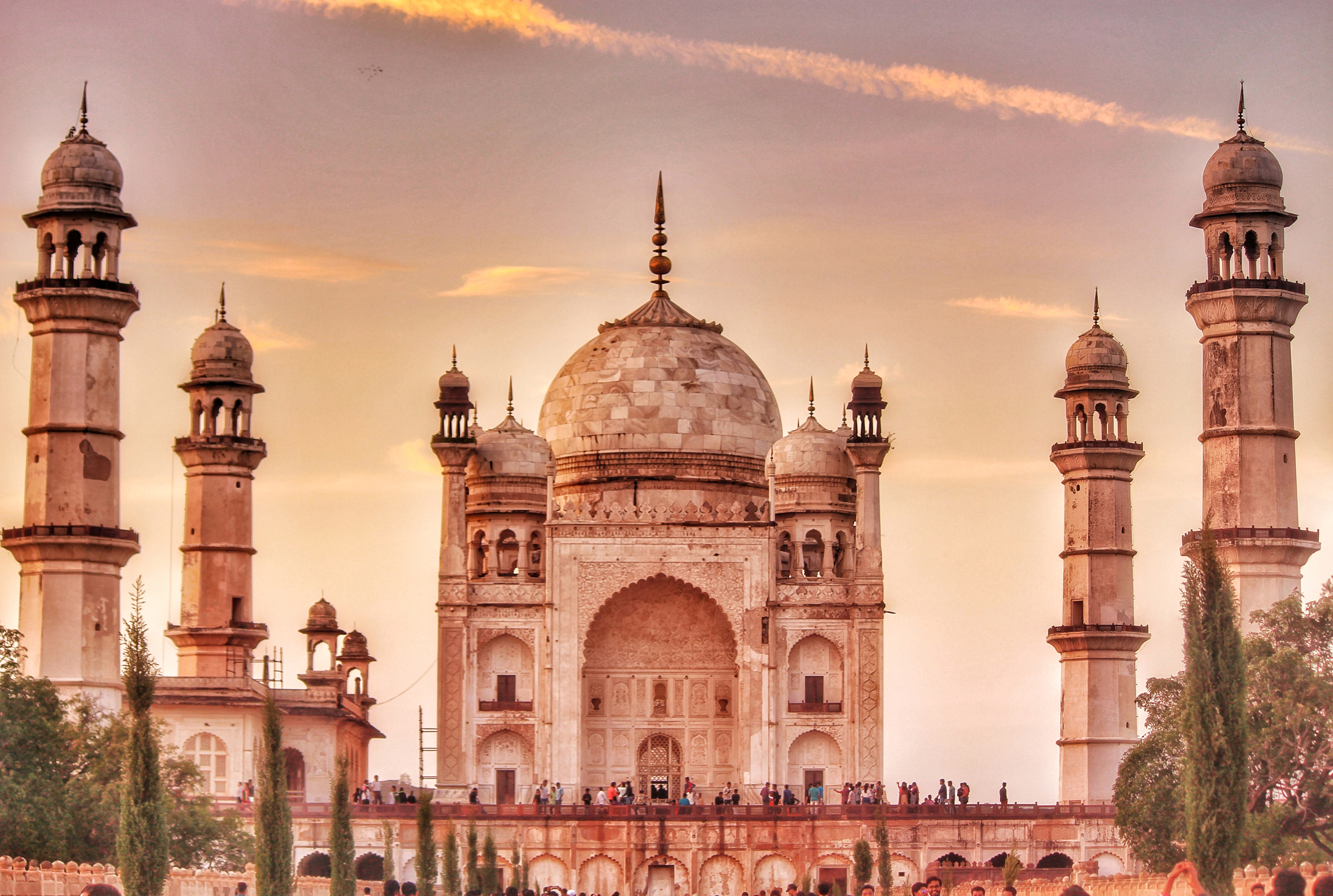
The tomb at dusk

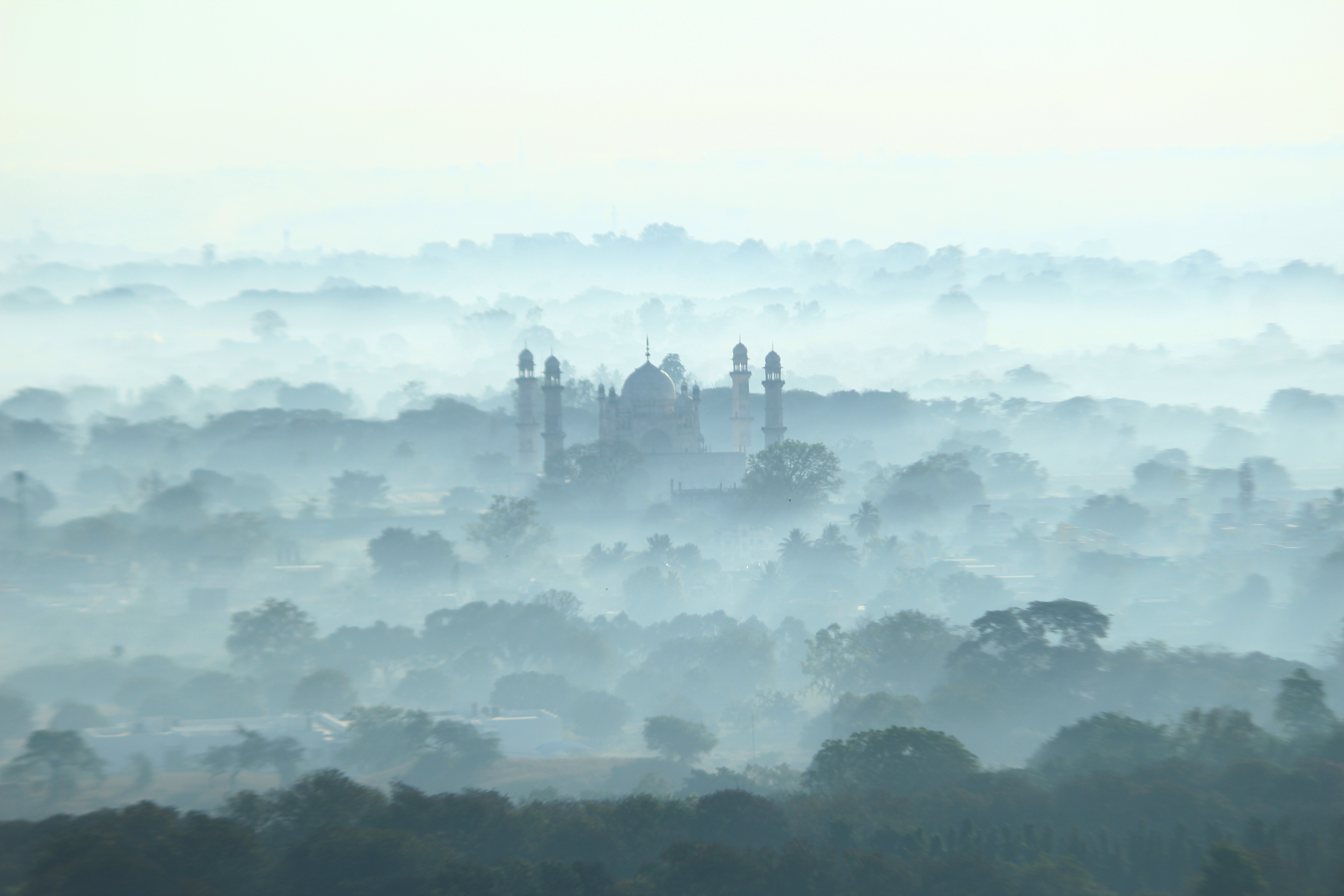
The tomb in fog

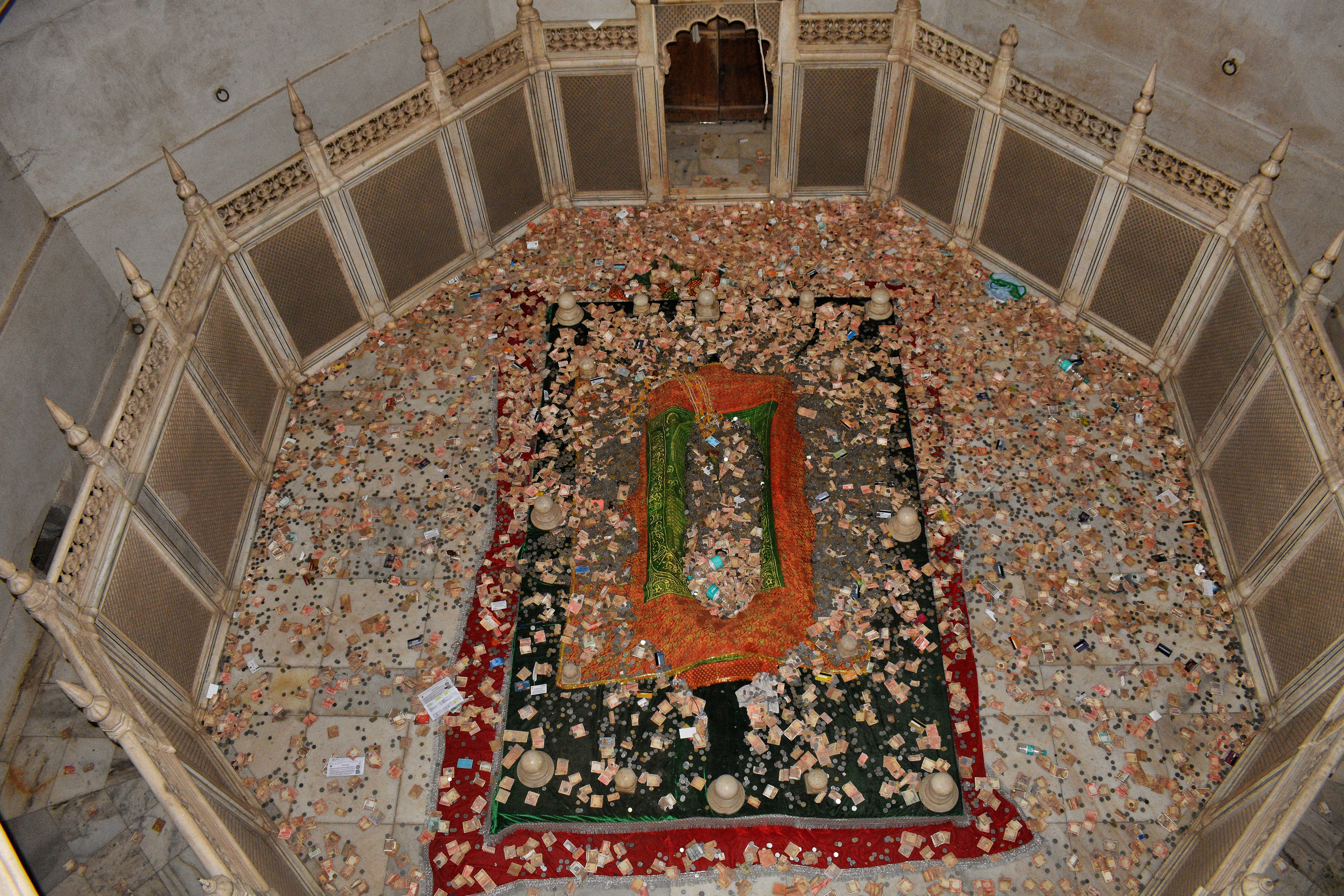
The cenotaph of Dilras Banu Begum

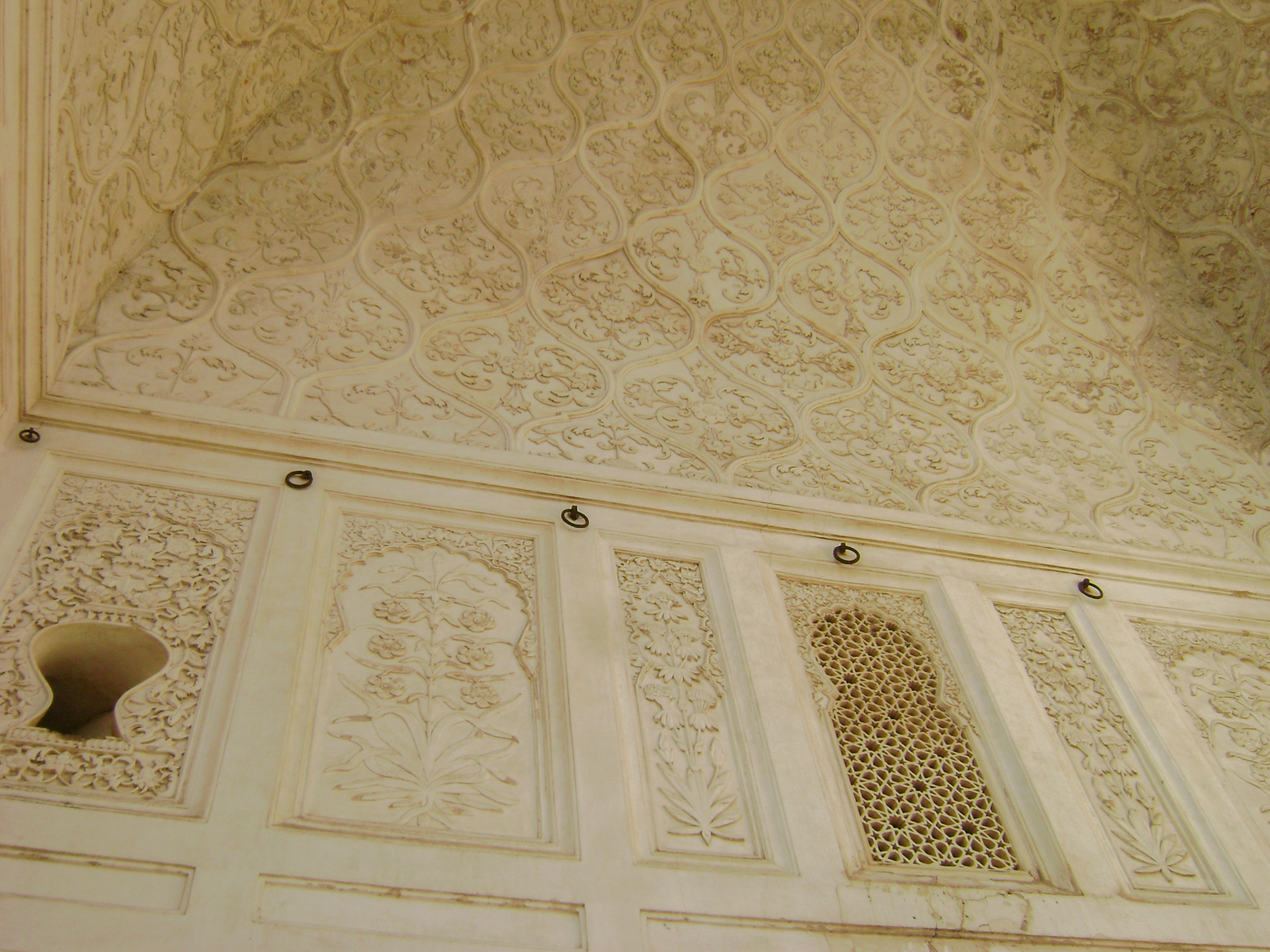
Floral patterns on marble

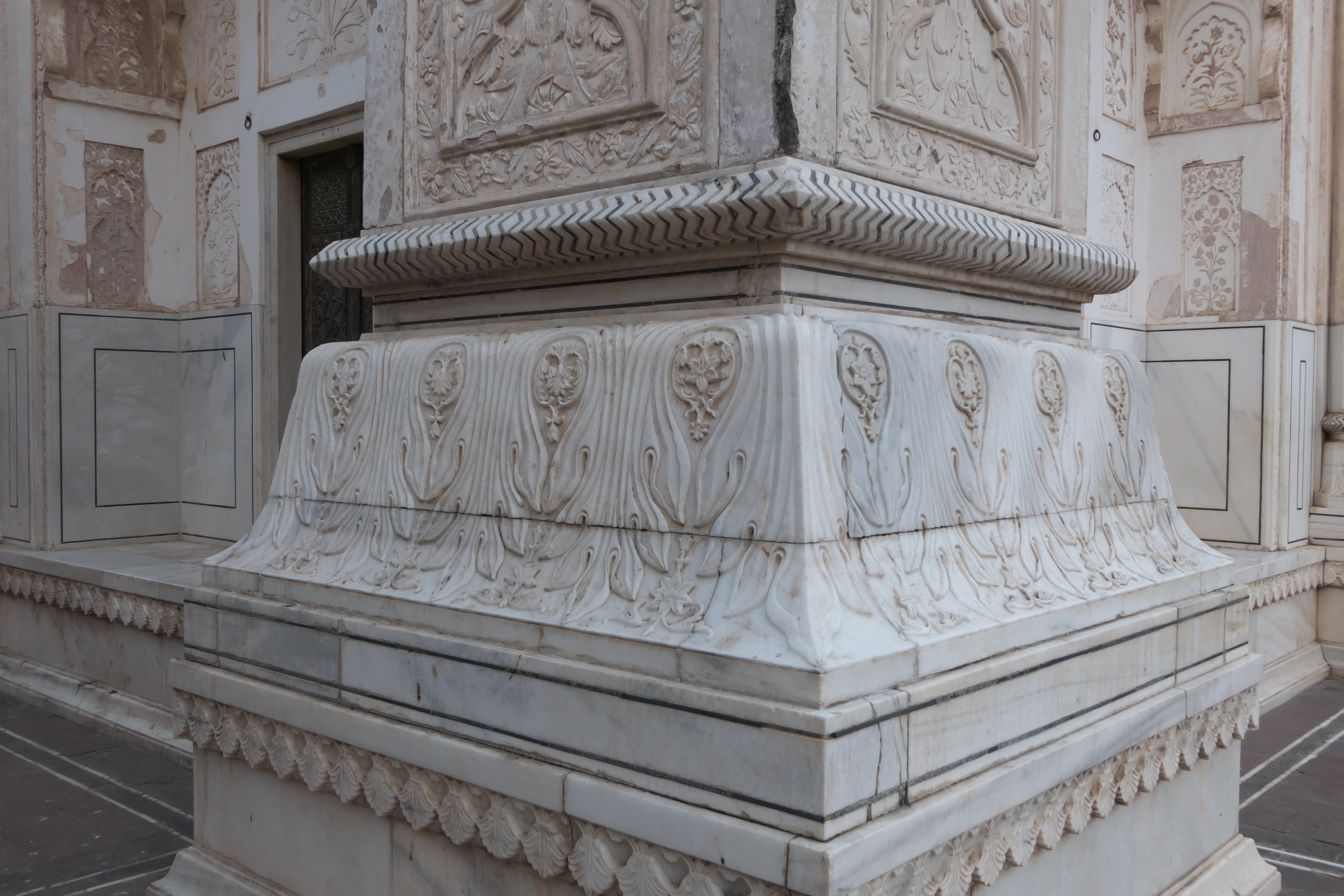
Column detailing design

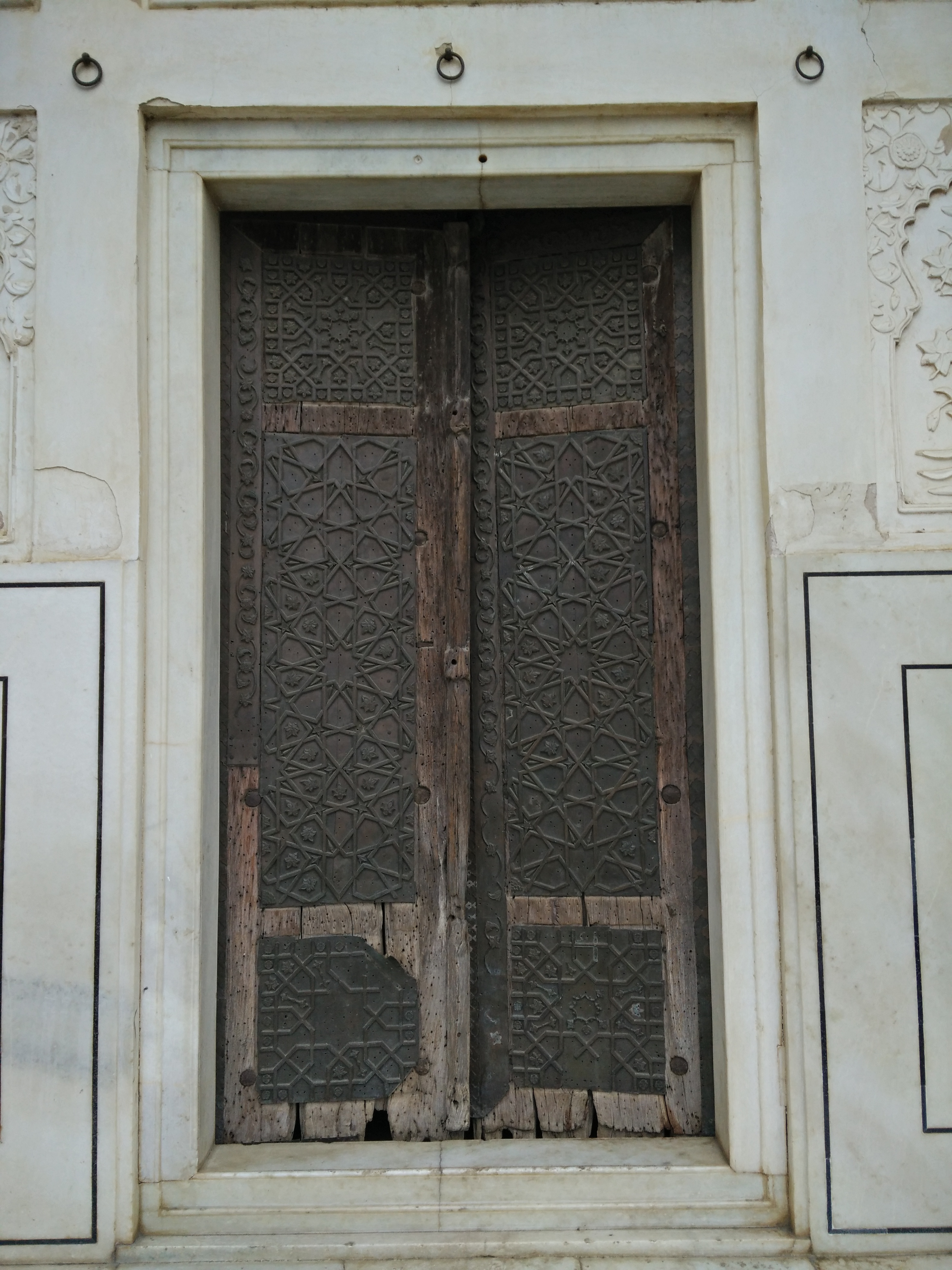
Decorative artwork on the Door

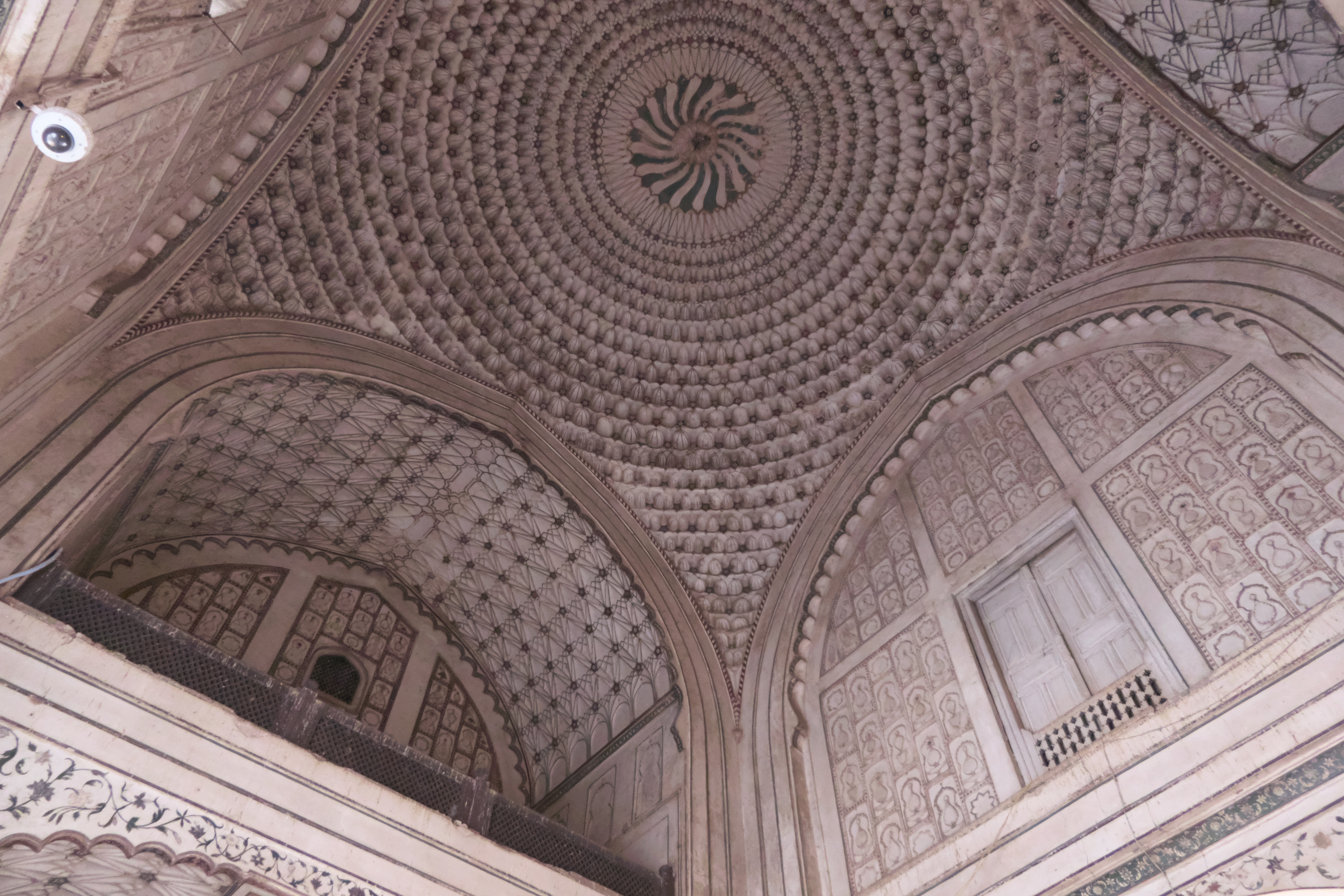
Tomb from inside

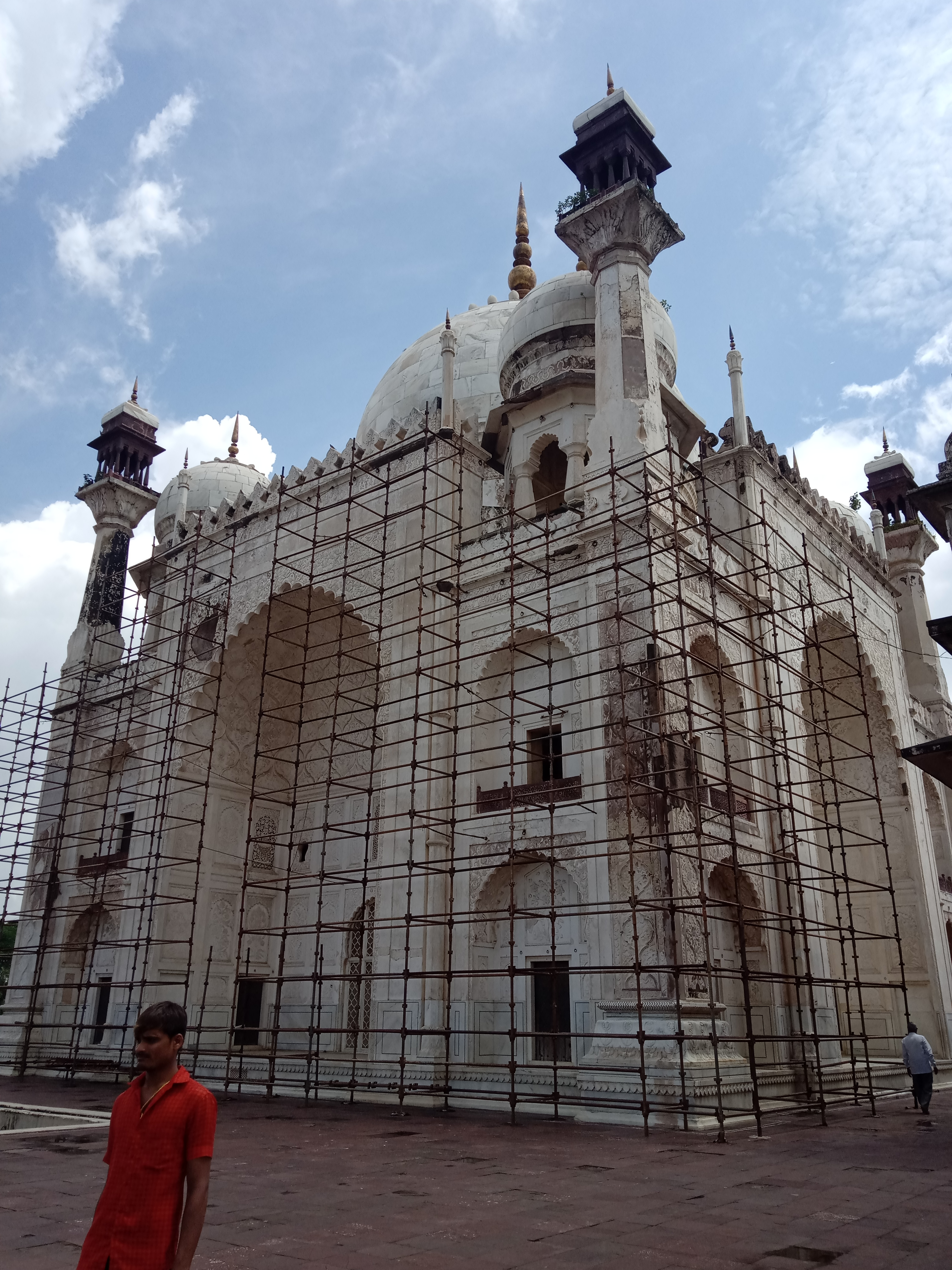
Restoration of the tomb underway

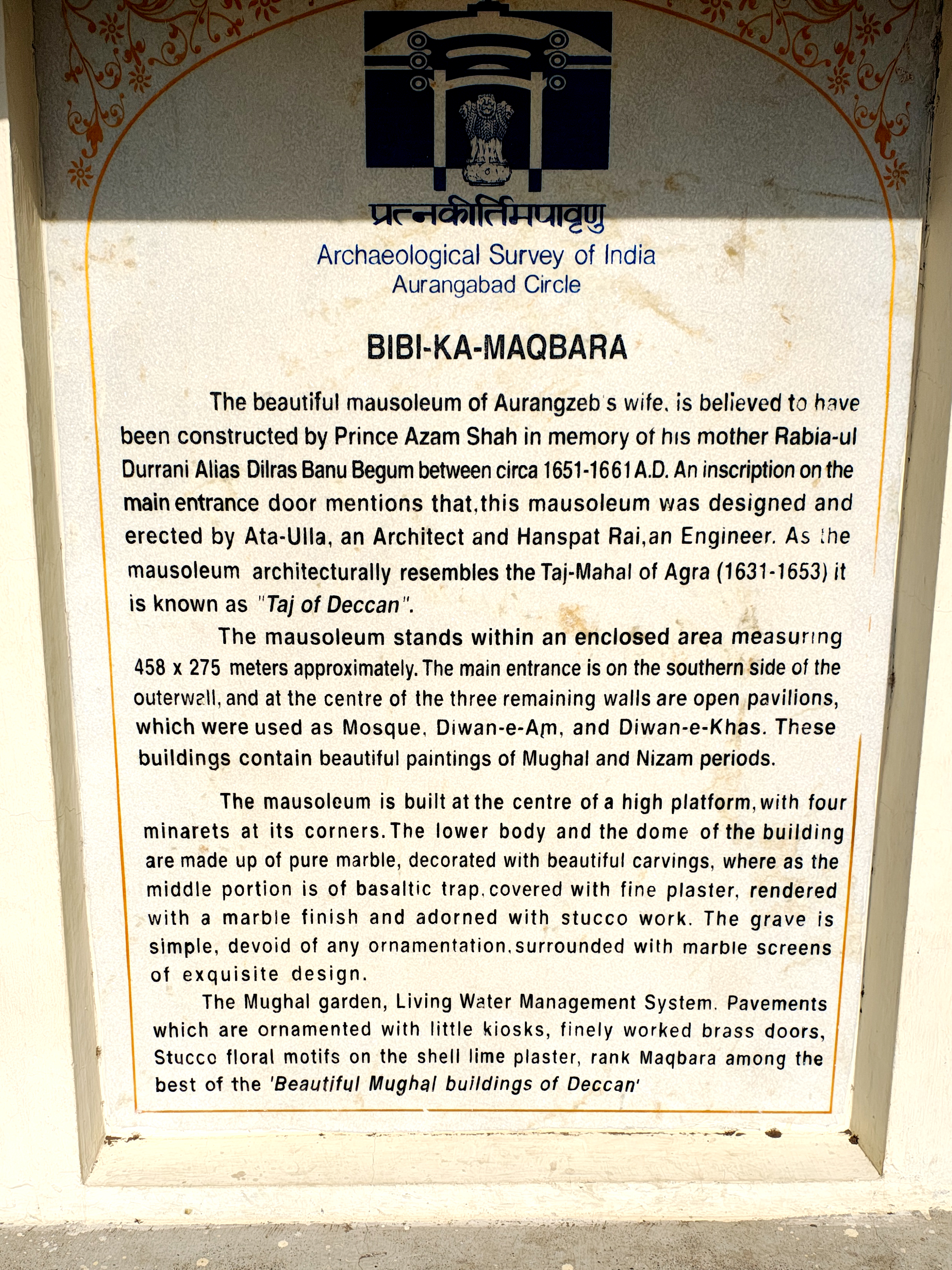
Information plaque near ticket counter

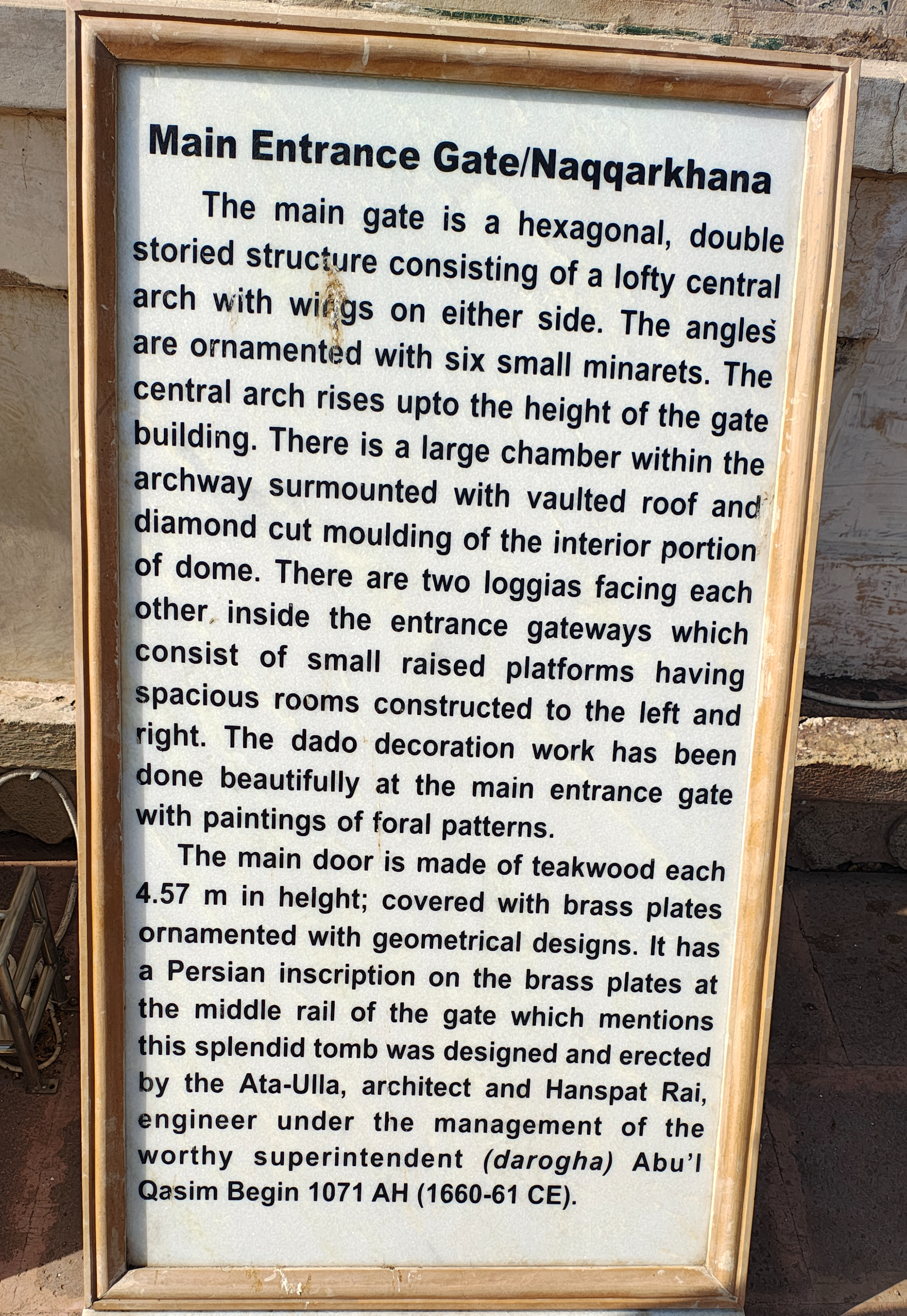
Main entrance gate information plaque

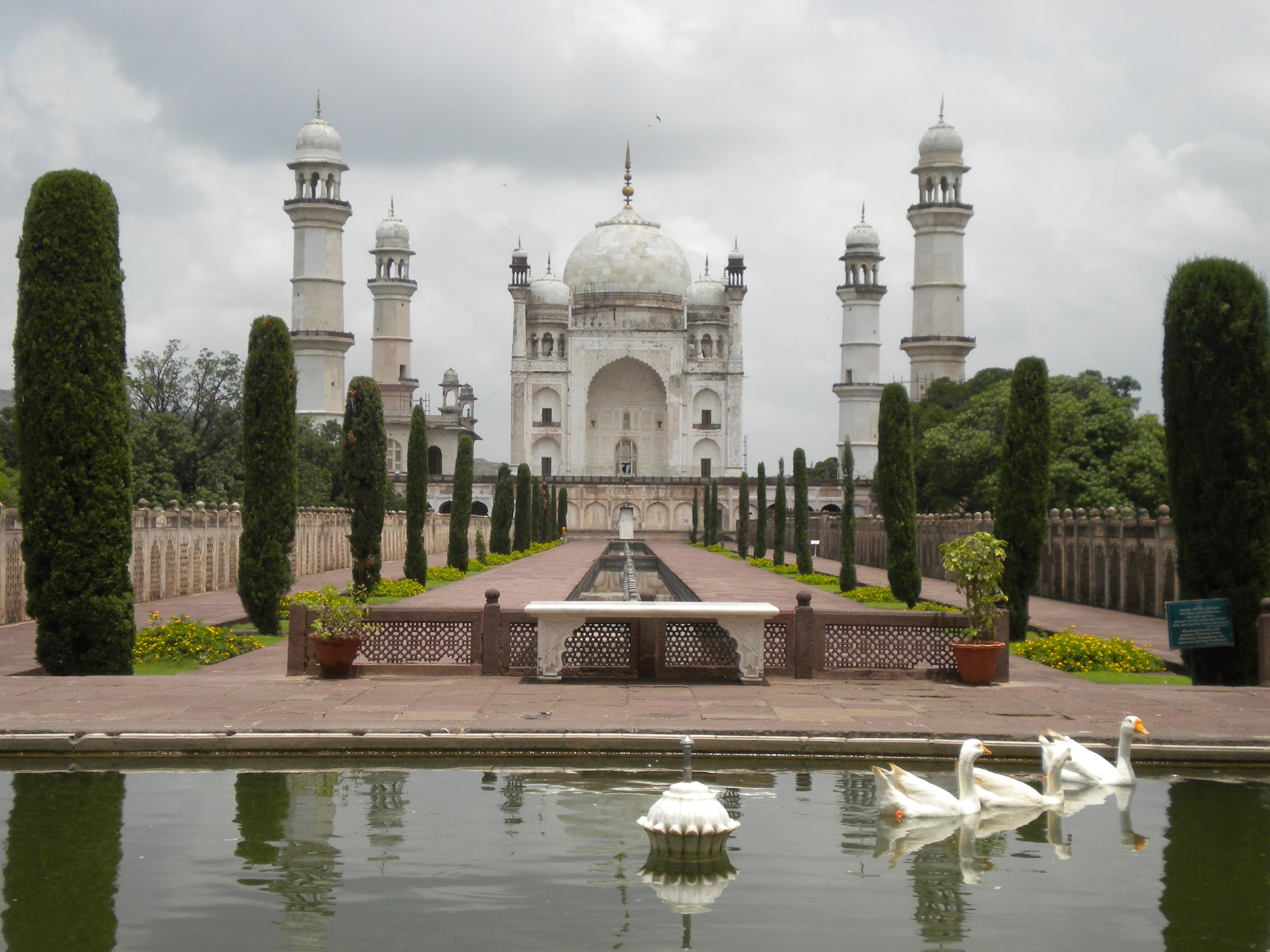
Geese in the garden pool

== Sources ==
- Asher, Catherine Blanshard. Architecture of Mughal India, Part 1. Cambridge University Press. ISBN 978-0-521-26728-1.
