= Lutfullah Muhandis =

Mughal era mathematician and historian

Lutfullah Muhandis was a 17th century Mughal-era mathematician and historian.

== Biography ==
He was the second son of the architect Ustad Ahmad Lahori and brother of Ataullah Rashidi. His book Diwan-e-Muhandis discusses the artistic and architectural achievements of his father. He was also a well-known mathematician, with a practical treatise on geometrical shapes in his credit. He was also involved in architecture and completed projects in Mandu and Peshwar as well as several commissions for Dara Shikoh.
