= Ustad Ahmad Lahori =

Mughal architect (died 1649)

- Born: c. 1570–1575
- Died: 1649
- Occupation: Architect
- Buildings: Red Fort, Delhi (with Ustad Hamid)

Signature
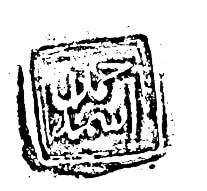

Ustad Ahmad Lahori (lit. 'Master Ahmad of Lahore'; died 1649), also known as Ahmad Mi'mar (lit. 'Ahmad the Architect'), was an architect and engineer in the service of the Mughal emperor Shah Jahan. Shah Jahan's official chronicle names him, together with Ustad Hamid, among the architects of the Red Fort in Delhi (1639–1648).

He is widely described as the architect of the Taj Mahal in Agra, but the identity of the Taj Mahal's architect or architects is not definitely known. Shah Jahan's official histories name only the supervisors of its construction; the only explicit evidence for the attribution to Ahmad is a poem by his son Lutfullah Muhandis, written several years after Ahmad's death.

== Architects at Shah Jahan's court ==
Shah Jahan's court histories emphasise the emperor's personal involvement in his building projects. In the Islamic world a building was associated in the first instance with its patron, and Shah Jahan had himself represented as his own architect. The emperor held daily meetings with his architects, and according to the official historian Abdul Hamid Lahori he made "appropriate alterations to whatever the skilful architects designed after many thoughts". His historians claim that most of his buildings were designed by the emperor himself, and the credit for them, even for their overall concept, went to Shah Jahan as the supreme architect.

Persian chroniclers of the period commonly praised the skill of builders in conventional terms without naming them. Unlike Shah Jahan's painters, who could sign their works, his architects are mentioned in the sources only at random, and no portrait of a Mughal architect is known. The supervisors (sarkar) of building projects are named more often, although the exact nature of their role is not defined.

== Career ==
=== Red Fort ===
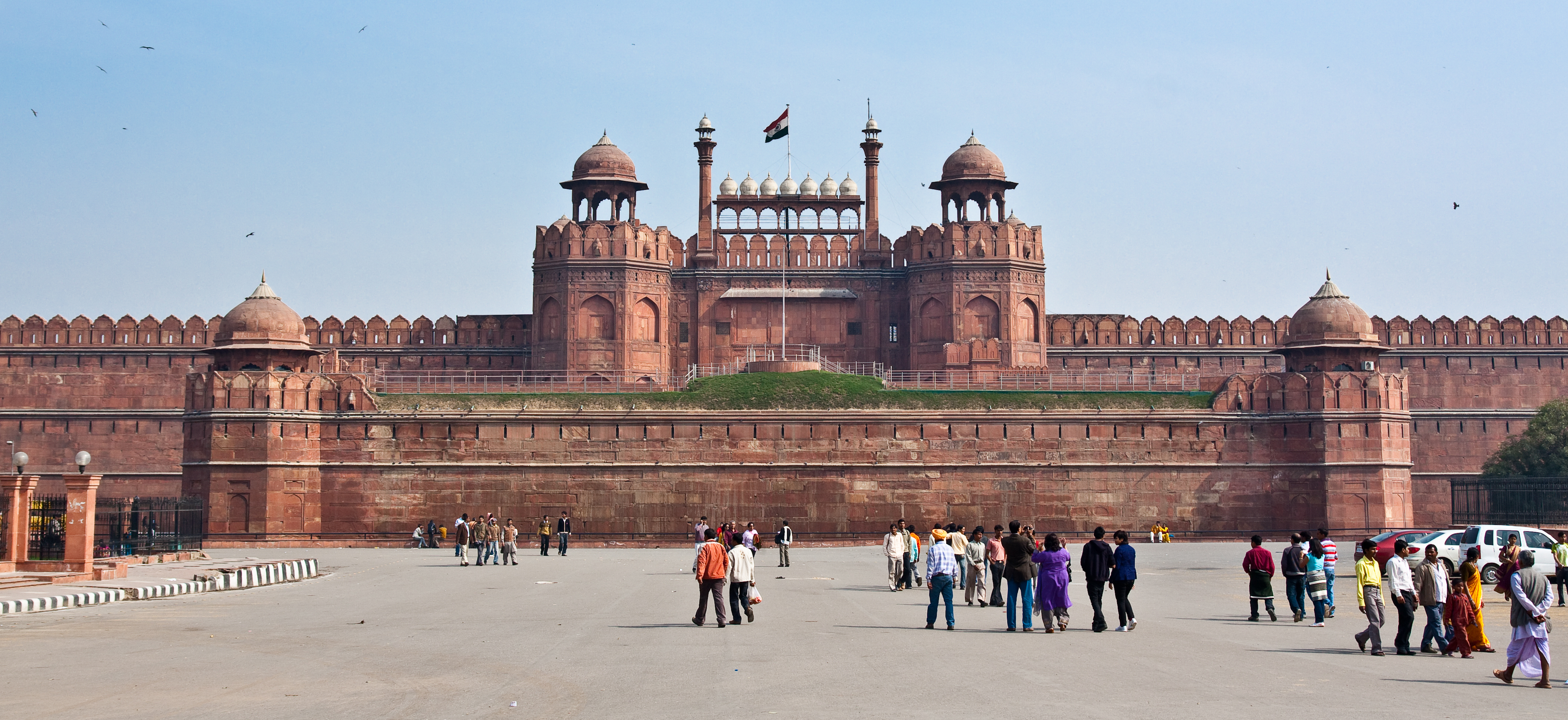
Lahori Gate of the Red Fort

In 1639 Shah Jahan decided to build a new palace-fortress at Delhi as the centre of a new capital, Shahjahanabad. In Begley and Desai's translation of the official chronicle of Muhammad Waris, "the expert engineers and chief architects, Ustad Ahmad and Ustad Hamid, worked out a plan according to the scheme approved by the Emperor", under the supervision of Ghairat Khan, the governor of Delhi. Ground was broken on 29 April 1639 and the foundations were laid on 12 May 1639. Makramat Khan, who had supervised the construction of the Taj Mahal, later supervised the building of the fort. Shah Jahan made his first state entry into the completed fort on 18 April 1648.

=== Other references ===
Begley and Desai collect a few other 17th-century documents that they take to refer to him. An order included in the letter-writing manual (insha) of Harkarn Das instructs that Ustad Ahmad is not to be detained when crossing the Chenab at Gujrat on official duties, and an undated letter by the court poet Mulla Tughra praises "Mulla Ahmad Mi'mar". Both are given in translations adapted from M. A. Chaghtai; Begley and Desai could not locate the Persian text of Tughra's letter. An undated and partly illegible letter describes an architect named Ustad Ahmad working on a fort at Shamshergarh and other structures at Hasan Abdal; Begley and Desai describe their translation of it as a tentative reconstruction.

=== Jama Masjid ===
The Jama Masjid in Delhi was begun in 1650, the year after Ahmad's death. Begley and Desai suggested that he and Ustad Hamid may have prepared plans for it before his death, while noting that there is no documentary evidence for this. His son Nur Allah signed the dedicatory inscription on the mosque's facade.

== Attribution of the Taj Mahal ==
=== Contemporary records ===
Excavation for the foundations of the Taj Mahal began in January 1632. The official historian Abdul Hamid Lahori states that the complex was completed in about twelve years "under the superintendence of Makramat Khan and Mir 'Abd al-Karim". Mir Abd al-Karim had been Jahangir's chief architect, and from 1633 to 1646 he was Superintendent of Buildings (darogha-i-'imarat) at Agra; Makramat Khan was primarily an administrator, though one with engineering and mathematical knowledge. The official histories name no architect for the building.

=== Lutfullah's poem ===
The attribution to Ahmad comes from the Diwan-i Muhandis, a collection of poems by his second son, Lutfullah, probably composed not long after 1656. It was brought to scholarly attention in the 1930s by Sayyid Sulaiman Nadvi and M. A. Chaghtai. In a poem praising his father, Lutfullah calls him "the architect of the King" and states that "at the orders of the world-conquering king, he constructed the edifice of the tomb of Mumtaz Mahal", and afterwards the fort of Delhi. Among the brief references to Ahmad in the works of his sons, this is the only one that credits him with the tomb. In a verse preface to one of his mathematical treatises, his eldest son, Ataullah, states that his father became "chief architect (mi'mar-i-kull) in this court". An inscription left by Lutfullah at Mandu in 1659 likewise calls his father "architect of Shah Jahan" (mi'mar-i-Shah Jahani).

=== Scholarly views ===
Begley and Desai described the evidence identifying Ahmad as the Taj Mahal's architect as "primarily circumstantial". They argued that, because the poem's claim about the Delhi fort is corroborated by the official history, its claim about the tomb "must also be taken seriously". They considered Mir Abd al-Karim the only other possible candidate, but noted that the sources describe him and Makramat Khan only as supervisors.

Koch writes that the identity of the architect or architects of the Taj Mahal is not definitely known. She names two architects mentioned in connection with the building: Mir Abd al-Karim, whom Lahori names as a supervisor of its construction, and Ahmad, who was credited with building it by his son, "though not in the official chronicles".

=== Other claims and popular accounts ===
Before Lutfullah's poem came to light, the absence of an architect's name in the histories led to speculation. The 17th-century traveller Sebastian Manrique claimed that an Italian goldsmith, Geronimo Veroneo, had designed the Taj Mahal, a claim now regarded as discredited; in the 19th century local informants of the British fabricated the story of an architect from Turkey named "Ustad Isa". Koch cites a newspaper's statement that "the chief architect is known to have been Ustad – or Master – Ahmad Lahori", together with the story that Shah Jahan had him blinded so that nothing could rival the Taj, as examples of stories about the monument presented as historical fact.

== Learning and title ==
According to Lutfullah, Ahmad was conversant with Euclid's Elements, understood the Almagest and knew the movements of the planets. Lutfullah states that Shah Jahan gave him the title Nadir al-'Asr ("Wonder of the Age"). Ataullah already refers to his father by this title in a work dated 1634–35. His grandson Imam al-Din Riyazi relates a family account, which he says passed from Ahmad to Lutfullah and then to him, that Ahmad usually prevailed in debates with Makramat Khan. No writings by Ahmad himself are known to survive.

== Life and family ==
His date of birth is unknown; Begley and Desai estimate around 1570–1575. Two chronograms in Lutfullah's Diwan give the year of Ahmad's death as 1059 AH (1649). He had three sons, all of whom Lutfullah describes as architects:

- Ataullah Rashidi, the eldest, wrote treatises on mathematics, including a Persian translation of Bhaskara's Bijaganita dedicated to Shah Jahan in 1634–35. The gateway inscription of the Bibi Ka Maqbara at Aurangabad, completed in 1660–61, names him as its architect.
- Lutfullah Muhandis was an engineer, mathematician and poet, and carried out commissions for the prince Dara Shikoh.
- Nur Allah was a calligrapher; his signature appears on the facade inscription of the Jama Masjid in Delhi.

His grandsons included Lutfullah's sons Imam al-Din Riyazi, author of the Baghistan, and the mathematician Khair Allah, as well as the Sufi Shah Kalim Allah Jahanabadi.

== See also ==
- Mughal architecture
- Ustad Isa
