= Ustad Isa =

Persian architect

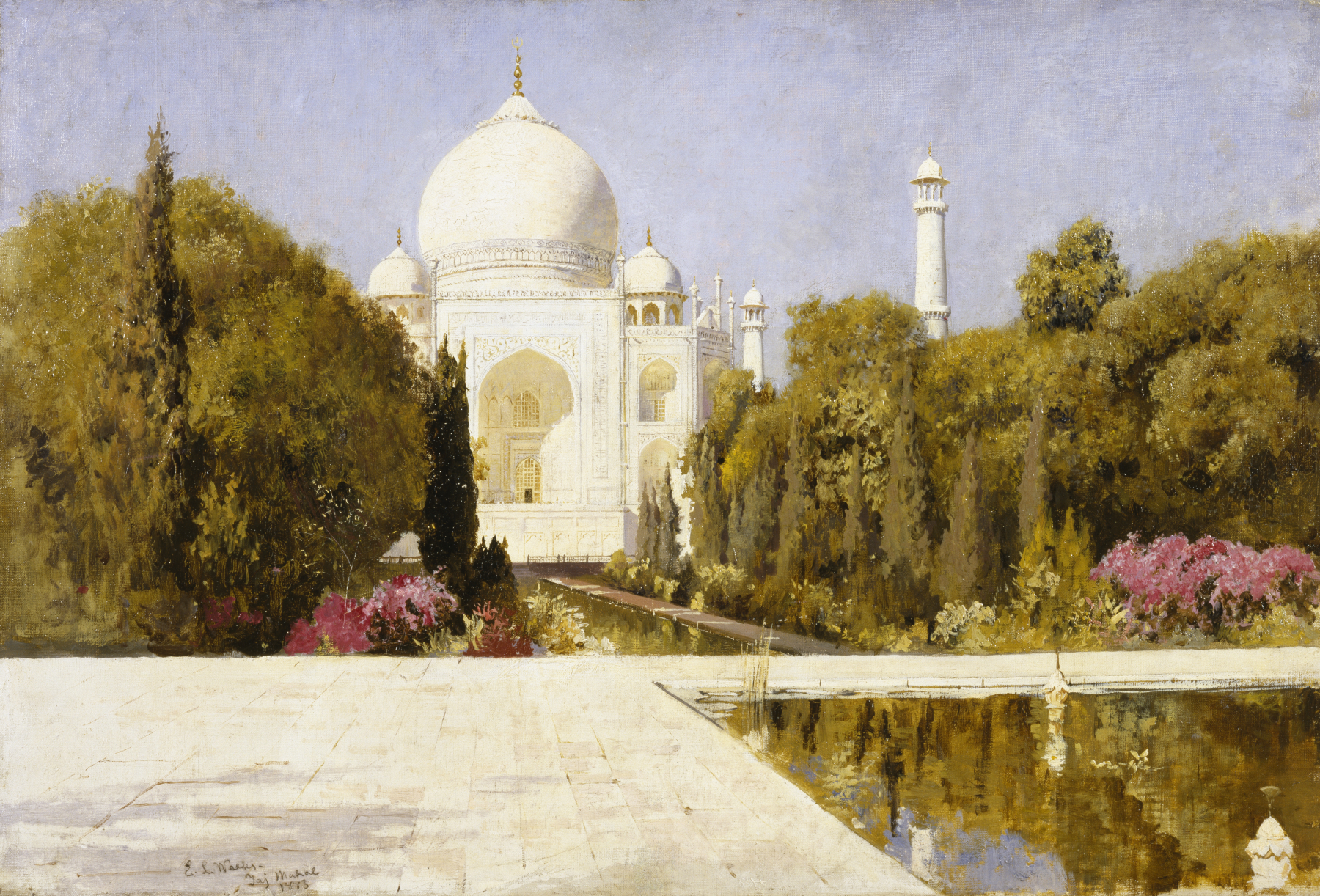
The Taj Mahal.

Ustad Isa Shirazi (Persian: استاد عيسى شیرازی) was a Persian architect from the city of Shiraz in Safavid Persia (modern-day Iran) often described as the assistant architect of the Taj Mahal in Agra, India.

The lack of complete and reliable information as to whom the credit for the design belongs, led to innumerable speculations. Scholars suggest the story of Ustad Isa was born of the eagerness of the British in the 19th century to believe that such a beautiful building should be credited to a European architect. Local informants were reported to have started British curiosity regarding the origins of the Taj by also supplying them with fictitious lists of workmen and materials from all over Asia. Not much is currently known about his background though his surname Shirazi indicates Persian origin. Certain sources have conflated Ustad Isa Shirazi with Isa Muhammad Effendi, which would corroborate a Turco-Persian origin.

Recent research suggests the architect, Ustad Ahmad Lahauri was the most likely candidate as the chief architect of the Taj Mahal, an assertion based on a claim made in writings by Lahauri's son Lutfullah Muhandis.

== See also ==
- Taj Mahal- Built (1632–1653)
- Mughal architecture
- Shah Jahan (1628–1707)

Ustad Isa Shirazi was the assistant of Ustad Ahmad Lahori.
