= Ataullah Bogdan Kopański =

Polish historian (born 1948)

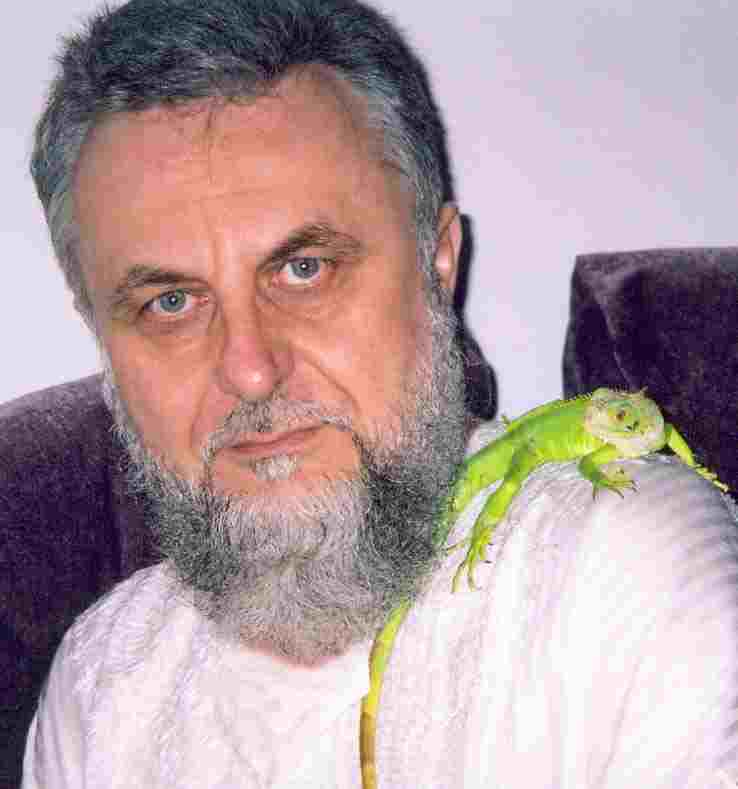
- Born: 1948 (age 77–78); Katowice, Upper Silesia, Poland
- Citizenship: Polish, American, Malaysian
- Occupation: Historian
- Known for: Anticommunist dissident

Ataullah Bogdan Kopański (born in 1948) is a Polish historian of Central and Eastern Europe, especially of Muslims in the region, today based in Malaysia.

== Personal life ==
He was born into a family of ethnic Silesian background. He converted to Islam when on a student exchange in Turkey in 1974. He added to his birth name the Arabic first name Ataullah, which is the literal translation of his Polish-Slavic name Bogdan, which stands for 'God's gift.' Ataullah Bogdan Kopański married Mariam bint Abd ur-Rahman, whom he met in Syria, and has four children with her, Khalid, Tareq, Summaya and Saleheddin.

== Political activities ==
In 1962, when only 14, he was fascinated by the success of the Arab national and anti-colonial forces that defeated the French colonial armies in the Algerian War, gaining independence for their country. When attending a military college in Kętrzyn (Ger. Rastenburg) in 1966-1969, he actively opposed the Polish communist regime during the 1968 Polish political crisis, and as a result was expelled from the Officer School, and became a political prisoner for the first time. He continued his studies at the University of Silesia in Katowice, and after graduation was employed there as a lecturer, adjunct and researcher. In 1980-81, when Poland was swept by a wave of anti-communist strikes, and around ten million joined the anti-communist Solidarity trade union, Kopański co-founded a branch of this broad grassroots social movement at the University of Silesia.

On the introduction of martial law in Poland on December 13, 1981, the leadership and activists of Solidarity were summarily rounded up by the military junta presided by General Wojciech Jaruzelski. Kopański was one of the interned, he became a political prisoner for the second time in his life. Between 1981 and 1982 he was detained in Strzelce Opolskie, Uherce Mineralne, and Rzeszów. Upon his release together with his family, he left for the United States in 1983.

Following the end of communism in Poland (1989), Kopański joined the Silesian Autonomy Movement and the Związek Ludności Narodowości Śląskiej (Union of the People of the Silesian Nationality) (pl).

== Education and academic career ==
In 1975 Kopański graduated with an MA in History from the University of Silesia, where he was also granted a PhD in Humanities five years later. His work at the university was cut short by his detention in late 1981. After the release he continued his academic career at universities and Islamic research institutes in the United States, Syria, India, Pakistan, Bosnia and South Africa, before becoming Head of the Department of the Eurasian Studies, Da'Wah Academy, International Islamic University, Islamabad, Pakistan. In 1995 he became a professor of history in the Department of History and Civilization, Kuliyyah (Faculty) of Islamic Revealed Knowledge and Human Sciences at the International Islamic University Malaysia in Gombak, Selangor, Malaysia, located in the north-east of Greater Kuala Lumpur.

== Research ==
Kopański's research initially focused on the relations between Poland–Lithuania, the Ottoman Empire, and the Crimean Khanate, before moving to the history of Muslims and Islam in Eurasia. Nowadays, he is completing three monographs on the colonial war crimes against Muslims, the Mediterranean Islamic-Christian Frontiers during the Saeculum Obscurum ("Dark Age" of early medieval Europe) and the early ages of the Islamic civilization in the Malay Archipelago. His other project is to construct a multimedia imago mundi for his students and colleagues, which he is compiling from photographs, films and audio material gathered during his extensive annual research trips across the Mediterranean, the Middle East, Central Asia, and Southeast Asia.

== Books ==
- Kopanski, Ataullah Bogdan (1992). The Broken Crescent: The Rise and Fall of the Muslim Crimea (1449-1989) (853-1410H). Islamabad: Islamic Book Foundation. ISBN 9789694241272.
- Kopanski, Ataullah Bogdan (1995). Sabres of Two Easts: An Untold History of Muslims in Eastern Europe: Their Friends and Foes. Islamabad: Institute of Policy Studies. pp. xxvii + 447. ISBN 9694480310.
- Kopański, Ataullah Bogdan (2002). Religion and Warfare: The Earliest Period of the Spread of Islam in Europe. Kuala Lumpur: Islamic Arts Museum Malaysia and International Islamic University Malaysia. p. 92. ISBN 9781904911944.
- Kopański, Ataullah Bogdan; Mazlum Uyar (2000). Osmanlı Barışı ve batı meselesi The Issue of Peace in the West of the Ottoman Empire. Ankara: Türkiye Diyanet Vakfı Yayınları. p. 67. ISBN 9789753893602.
- Islamic manuscripts in Polish, Czech and Slovakian public libraries, archives and private collections. 2008. Kuala Lumpur: Universiti Sains Islam Malaysia (USIM) and World Congress of Muslim Librarians & Information Scientists (wCOMLIS). http://dspace.unimap.edu.my/dspace/handle/123456789/8038.
- Kopański, Ataullah Bogdan (2010). Islam and the Third Reich. London: Steven Books. pp. 15 + 4 pp of plates. ISBN 9781904911944.
- Kopański, Ataullah Bogdan; Dayana Ariffin (2012). Emperors, Soldiers and Cities of the Desert: A survey on the Roman-Arab relation from the invasion of Syria (64 BCE) to Council of Nicaea (325 CE). Berlin: LAP Lambert Academic Publishing. p. 188. ISBN 978-3847323570.
