= Ataullah Rashidi =

17th-century Mughal architect and a mathematics writer

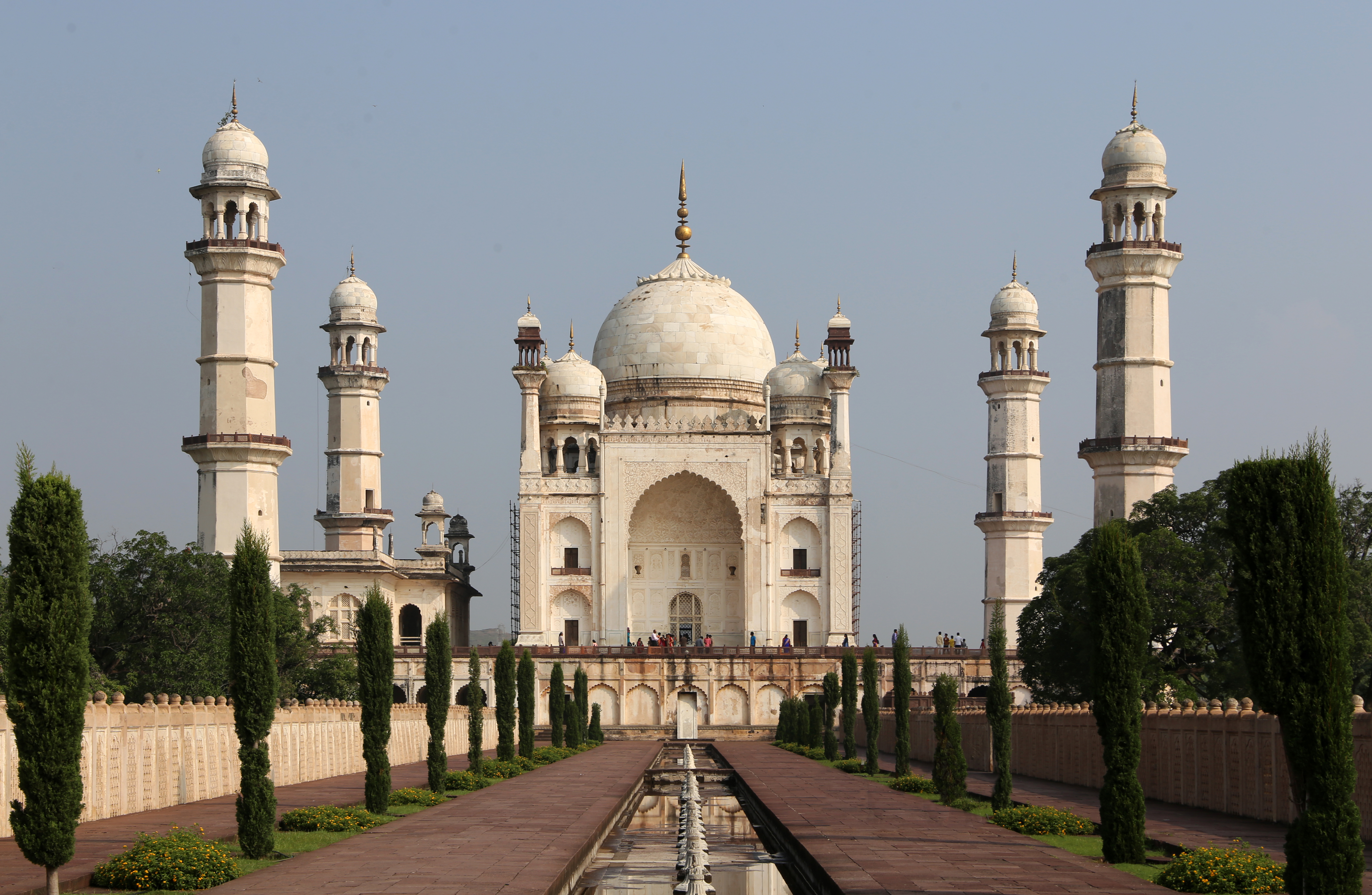
Ataullah designed the Bibi Ka Maqbara at Aurangabad

Ataullah Rushdi bin Ahmad Ma'mar (Note: Other transliterations of his name include 'Aṭāullāh Rushdī bin Aḥmad Ma'mār, 'Ata Allāh Rushdī ibn Aḥmad i Nādir, Ata Allah Rashidi, and Ata Allah Rashdi.) was a 17th-century architect and a mathematics writer from the Mughal Empire of present-day India. He designed the Bibi Ka Maqbara at Aurangabad and some buildings at Shahjahanabad. As a mathematics writer, he translated the Arabic-language Khulasat al-Hisab and the Sanskrit-language Bijaganita into Persian.

== Biography ==
Ataullah was the eldest son of Ahmad Ma'mar Lahori, the architect of Taj Mahal. He had two younger brothers, Lutfullah Muhandis and Nurullah, who were also involved in architecture.

Ataullah designed the buildings for emperor Shah Jahan's' new capital, Shahjahanabad. The only design attributed solely to him is that of Bibi Ka Maqbara, the mausoleum of Aurangzeb's wife Dilras Banu Begum, completed in 1660-1661.

Makramat Khan, a collaborator of his father, trained Ataullah in arithmetic, geometry, and astronomy. His younger brother Luftullah was also a famous mathematician. Ataullah wrote two works on mathematics in Persian language:

- Khulāṣat-ul Rāz or Khulasah-i-Raz ("Essence of Mystery [of Arithmetic]") is a book on arithmetic, algebra and mensuration. It is an abridged translation of Baha' al-din al-'Amili's Arabic language book Khulasat al-Hisab, which was used as a textbook in madrasas of medieval India. The author wrote the book in verse form, and dedicated it to the Mughal prince Dara Shikoh.
- Tarjuma'-i Bījganit or Tarjamah i Bij ganit (1044 AH / 1634-1635 CE) is a translation of Bhaskara II's Sasnkrit language book Bijaganita. The author praised Bhaskara as "a discoverer of wonderful truth and nice subtleties" and dedicated the book to the Mughal emperor Shah Jahan. Edward Strachey's English translation of the Ataullah's book was published in London in 1813. Manuscripts of this work are available at Banaras Hindu University, Madrasa Darul Ulum (Deoband), Raza Library (Rampur), Saidiyah Library (Hyderabad), Osmania University Library (Hyderabad), Madarasa Nadwatul Ulama, Madrasatul Waizeen, British Museum, India Office (London).
