= Christine Atallah =

Canadian singer-songwriter and writer

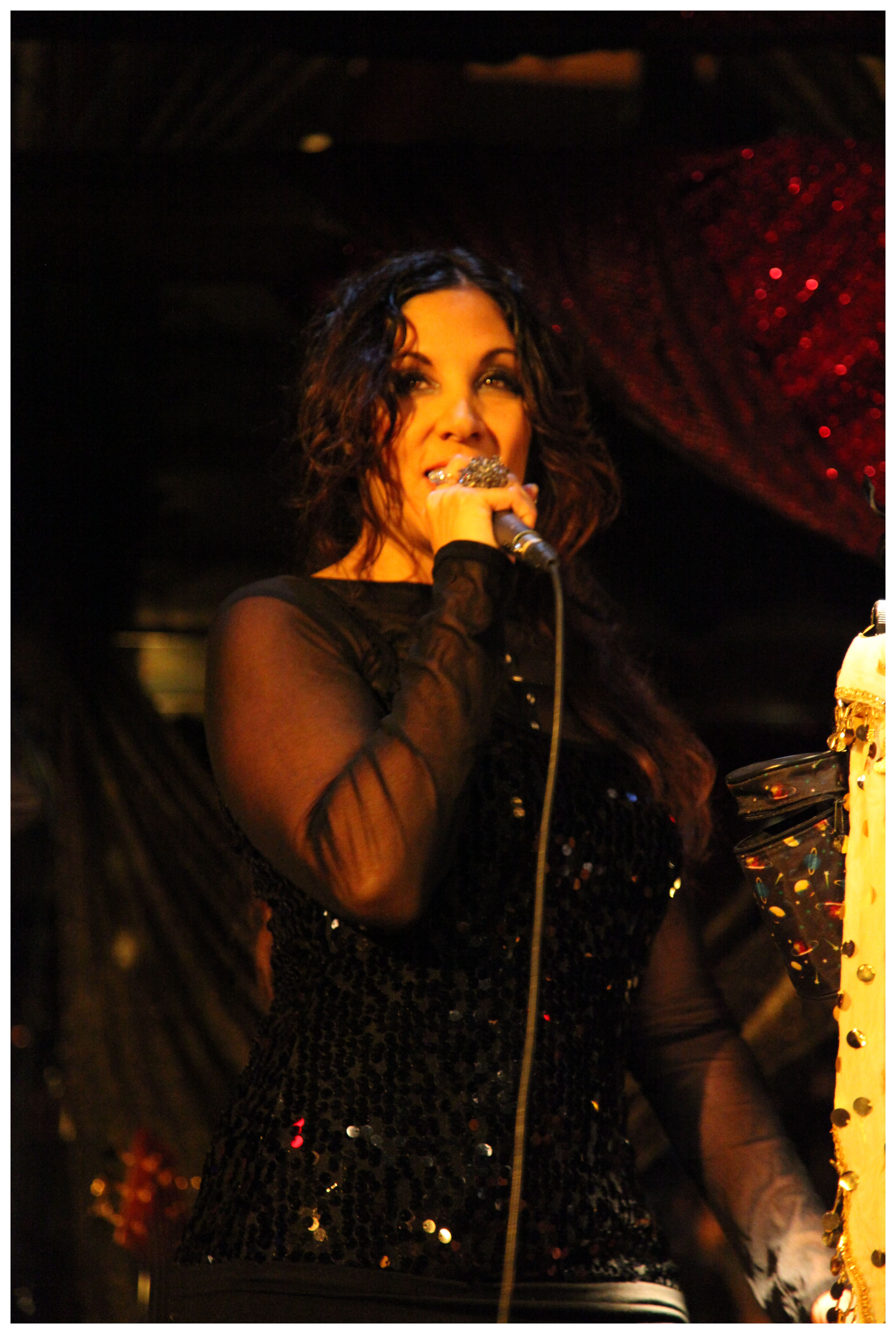

Background information
- Born: Christine Ann Atallah; December 7, 1965; Montreal, Quebec, Canada
- Died: October 29, 2011 (aged 45)
- Genres: Classical and world music
- Instrument: Voice ~ soprano
- Labels: Bolero Records

Christine Ann Atallah (December 7, 1965 – October 29, 2011) was a Canadian singer-songwriter and writer.

After obtaining degrees in broadcast journalism from Concordia University and in music from McGill University in Montreal, Atallah trained in Italy under Maestro Giuseppe Raffa before joining his touring production of the Verdi Opera Aida as a featured soloist.

Atallah next appeared in a singing performance in Denys Arcand's award-nominated film Jesus of Montreal. She then spent four years living in New York City, where she composed, wrote fiction and non-fiction, studied dance, recorded and appeared in films and music videos.

Atallah collaborated with numerous musicians. She worked with Canadian composer John Winiarz as his muse and collaborator, premiering some of his works. She also worked with Danny McLaughlin, co-writing the song "Let Me Be Me" with him and the composer Victor Simon.

In 2006 Atallah released Escapades, an album with the band The Bassalindos. This world music album was distributed by Bolero Records, an American label. In April 2011 she released an E.P. Aqua Aura. Atallah died on October 29, 2011, of undetermined causes, a few weeks after falling from a horse while shooting a music video.
