= Üsküplü Ata =

Ottoman poet

Üsküplü Ata (died after 1533) was an Ottoman poet of the 16th century. The precise dates of his birth and death are unknown. His ancestors had migrated from Iran to Rumelia, whereafter they settled in Üsküp (Skopje, present-day North Macedonia).

== Sources ==
- Zahirović, Nedim (2018). "Ata, Üsküplü". In Fleet, Kate; Krämer, Gudrun; Matringe, Denis; Nawas, John; Rowson, Everett (eds.). Encyclopaedia of Islam (3rd ed.). Brill Online. ISSN 1873-9830.
