= Majma-ul-Bahrain =

Sufi text on comparative religion

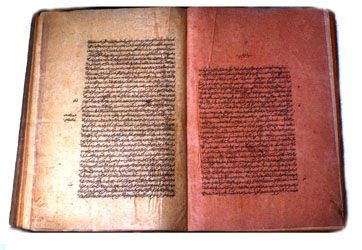
- Majma-ul-Bahrain in the Victoria memorial, Calcutta.
- Author: Dara Shukoh
- Original title: مجمع البحرین
- Language: Classical Persian
- Subject: Comparative religion
- Published: c. 1655

Majma-ul-Bahrain (Persian: مجمع البحرین, "The Confluence of the Two Seas" or "The Mingling of the Two Oceans") is a Sufi text on comparative religion authored by Mughal Shahzada Dara Shukoh as a short treatise in Persian, c. 1655. It was devoted to a revelation of the mystical and pluralistic affinities between Sufic and Vedantic speculation. It was one of the earliest works to explore both the diversity of religions and a unity of Islam and Hinduism and other religions. Its Hindi version is called Samudra Sangam Grantha and an Urdu translation titled Nūr-i-Ain was lithographed in 1872.

== Background ==
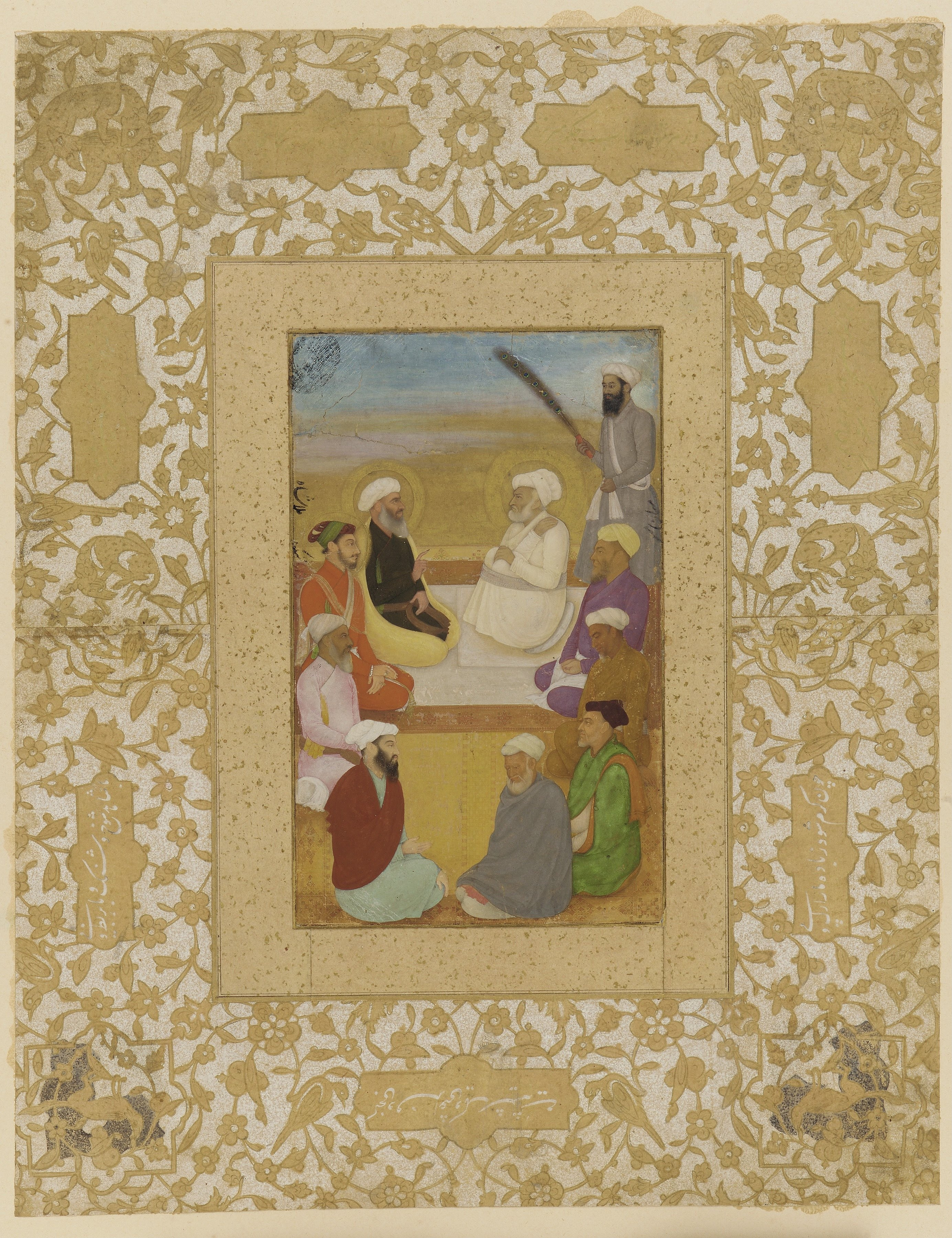
Shahzada Dara Shukoh seated with his spiritual master, Mian Mir, c. 1635.

During the 16th century, the Maktab Khana (translation bureau of Emperor Akbar, literally meaning house of translation) heavily contributed to altering the Muslim perception of Hinduism by translating works such as the Mahabharata into the Razmnāma (Persian: رزم نامہ, lit. Book of War), the Ramayana, and the Yoga Vashishta from ancient Sanskrit into Persian, as the Emperor Akbar sought to "form a basis for a united search for truth" and "enable the people to understand the true spirit of their religion". Akbar's efforts to cultivate Ṣulḥ-i-Kul (literally meaning "peace with all", "universal peace", or "absolute peace", as inspired by Sufi mystic principles) throughout his empire continued in-spirit with his descendent, Shahzada Dara Shukoh.

With a perennial worldview similar to Kabir and his Mughal ancestor Emperor Akbar, Dara Shukoh sought to understand the similarities between the religions of the land around him. After his time as a disciple of Mian Mir (witnessing events such as the foundation of the Golden Temple of Amritsar), Dara Shukoh began compiling his spiritual and mystical learnings in a series of books written between 1640 and 1653. The learning which resulted in Majma-ul-Bahrain occurred during this time, specifically encompassing nine years of researching and studying the Brahmavidya and the Qur'an. Dara Shukoh's learning caused him to travel across 14,000 km of the Indian subcontinent, searching for mystical knowledge in places such as Ajmer, Delhi, Agra, Allahabad, Varanasi, Kashmir, and Gujarat. The Shahzada wrote the Majma-ul-Bahrain when he was 42 and it was the last text he wrote before the struggle for succession which resulted in his defeat, humiliation, and death a few years later.

== Contents ==
The foremost focus of the treatise is to provide an exegesis on what is common between Hinduism and Islam, specifically in regards to Vedantic and Sufic mysticism and the numerous concepts therein. Dara Shukoh utilizes many terms from both branches of religion to illuminate the similarities between the two, albeit while exhibiting a knowledge more thorough of Sufic terminology in order to illume the Vedantic. Many Sufi saints are mentioned in the eleventh section, including al-Ghazali, Bayazid al-Bastami, Jalāl ad-Dīn Muhammad Rūmī, and Ibn al-'Arabi. The text begins with an introductory section and contains twenty sections with the following headings:

1. The Elements
2. The Senses
3. The Religious Exercises
4. The Attributes
5. The Wind
6. The Four Worlds
7. The Fire
8. The Light
9. The Beholding of God
10. The Names of God, the Most High
11. The Apostleship and the Prophetship
12. The Barhmand
13. The Directions
14. The Skies
15. The Earths
16. The Divisions of the Earth
17. The Barzakh
18. The Great Resurrection
19. The Mukt
20. The Night and the Day

== Aftermath ==
There was no other major text written on the subject of comparative religions and universal truth contemporaneous with the Majma-ul-Bahrain. According to the Siya-ul-Mutakherin by the historian Ghulam Husain Salim, the Majma-ul-Bahrain brought about the death of its own author when it was presented to the imperial ulama, who declared the work blasphemous and ordered the death of Shahzada Dara Shukoh, an order which was gladly carried out by his brother, Shahzada Aurangzeb, during the War of Succession. After being brought to Delhi, Dara Shukoh was put in chains and paraded through the streets of the capital whilst mounted atop an unclean elephant. In the official history of Aurangzib, the Maathir-i-Alamgiri, the official charge against Dara Shukoh is declared as the following:

"The pillars of the Canonical Law and Faith apprehended many kinds of disturbances from his life. So the Emperor [e.g. Aurangzid], both out of necessity to protect the Holy Law, and also for reasons of State, considered it unlawful to allow Dara to remain alive any longer as a destroyer of the public peace."

On 10 August 1659, Shahzada Dara Shukoh was beheaded on grounds of apostasy and his head was sent to his father, Shah Jahan. When Aurangzeb ascended to the imperial throne, he continued to execute others for political reasons (ex: his brother Murad Baksh and his nephew Sulaiman Shikoh) and persecute denizens of his empire on grounds of heresy, including the beheading of the Armenian Sufi mystic, Sarmad Kashani, for charges of antinomian atheism and the ninth Sikh Guru, Guru Tegh Bahadur, for refusing to convert to Islam, making the murder of his brother Dara Shukoh the first in a long line of executions.

== See also ==
- Din-i Ilahi
- Allopanishad
- Ganga–Jamuni Tehzeeb
