= Risala-i-Haq-Numa =

Sufi text on consciousness and meditation

- Dara Shikoh with Mian Mir and Mulla Shah, c. 1635; Mulla Shah inspired the contents of the Risala-i-Haq-Numa
- Author: Dara Shikoh
- Original title: رساله حق نما
- Language: Classical Persian
- Subject: Sufism; Meditation
- Published: c. 1646
- Pages: approx. 55

The Risala-i-Haq-Numa (Persian: رساله حق نما, transl. The Compass of Truth) is a 1646 Sufi work written in Persian by the Mughal prince Dara Shikoh, the oldest son of Emperor Shah Jahan and brother of Aurangzeb. In the work, the Shikoh describes four planes of existence from Sufi cosmology that correspond with four states of consciousness along with mystical-meditative practices that Shikoh claims come from Muhammad himself, passed down through esoteric chain of disciples.

== Background ==
While earlier Mughal rulers embraced the Shattari or Chishti orders, Shikoh's hunger for mystical experiences drew him to the Qadiri order and training under Mulla Shah; in this respect, the Risala-i-Haq-Numa gives insight into Qadiri mystical methodology from his time, along with some Chishti techniques. In thanks to his master, Shikoh later built the Akhund Mullah Shah Mosque in Srinagar.

== Content ==
Shikoh's four planes of existence and matching states of consciousness are as follows:

- Physical (Nisut); Waking
- Super-physical (Malakut); Dreaming
- Blissful (Jabarut); Deep sleep
- Divine (Lahut); Trance-consciousness

Shikoh also details different meditation methods, including breathing techniques (awurd-burd), focusing on the activity of the heart, and listening for an inner-primordial sound (sultan-ul-azkar).

The work includes stories of ancient philosophical and religious figures:

It is said that Plato once asked Moses (may peace be on him) 'O son of a hysteric woman, sayest thou ‘ my God speaks to me ’ when the fact is that God is above holding all such conversation?' Then Moses replied, 'Yes, I do claim this (that God talks to me), because from every side I hear a sound, which is ceaseless and continuous, and is not composed of letters.' When Plato heard this, he believed in Moses, and acknowledged that he was a messenger of God (because Moses spoke of the sound eternal, as the voice of God, and not of any human sound).

== Editions ==
A lithograph print of the work was published in 1896 by Munshi Nawal Kishore Press in Lucknow, including marginal notes added by an editor for clarificitions. In 1912, a translation (or, adaptation) or the work was done by the Islamia Lodge of the Theosophical Society in Benares. In 2012, Scott Kugle translated the work into English for the larger book Sufi Meditation and Contemplation, including a systematic rendition of traditional Sufi terms that was absent in the more perennial and Victorian stylizings of the Theosophical version.

== See also ==
- Din-i Ilahi
- Allopanishad
- Ganga–Jamuni Tehzeeb
