= Sirr-i-Akbar =

Book

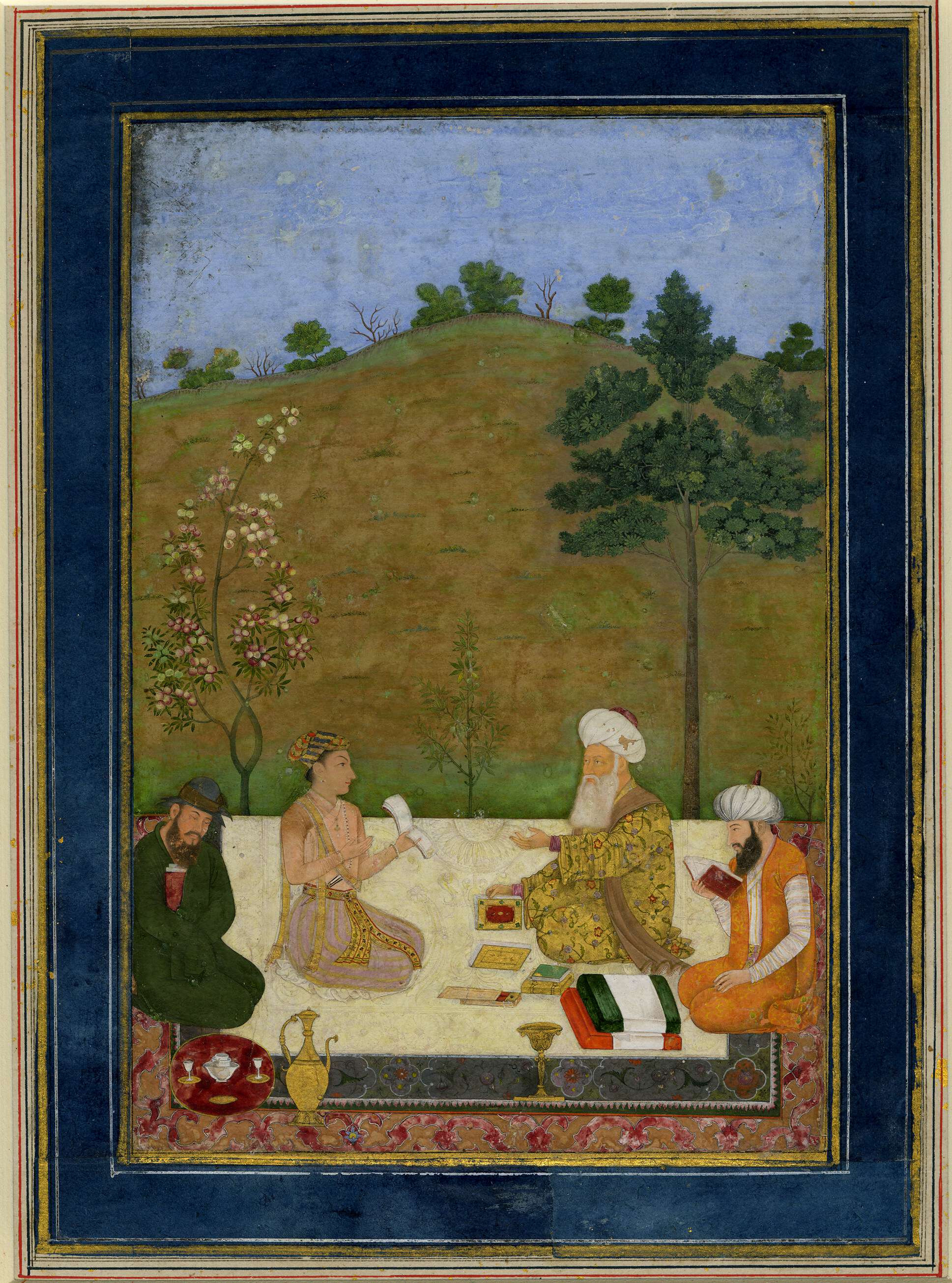
- Shahzada of the Mughals, Dara Shukoh, seated with three Sufi masters, c. 1650.
- Author: Dara Shukoh
- Language: Classical Persian
- Published: c. 1657

The Sirr-i-Akbar (Persian: سرِ اکبر, “The Greatest Mystery” or “The Greatest Secret”) is a version of the Upanishads authored by the Mughal-Shahzada Dara Shukoh, translated from Sanskrit into Persian, c. 1657. After years of Sufi learning, Dara Shukoh sought to uncover a common mystical language between Islam and Hinduism, boldly stating that the Kitab al-Maknun, or "Hidden Book", mentioned in the Qur'an (56:78) is none other than the Upanishads.

== Background ==
During his reign, Mughal Emperor Akbar commissioned his bureau of translation, Maktab Khana, to begin translating the Upanishads from Sanskrit into Persian in an effort to "form a basis for a united search for truth" and "enable the people to understand the true spirit of their religion." In his youth, Shahzada Dara Shukoh exhibited a deep enthrallment with mysticism, causing him to spend much of his life in research and study. After a spiritual tutelage of the Qadiri-Sufi saint, Mian Mir, Dara published a hagiographical compendium of the lives of various Islamic saints. After encountering a Dharmic-Gnostic saint, Baba Lal Dayal, Dara Shukoh's interests extended to the local mystical thought of the Vedantic tradition while also befriending Hindus, Christians, and Sikhs, including the seventh Sikh Guru, Guru Har Rai, and the Armenian-born mystic-atheist poet, Sarmad Kashani.

== Legacy ==
Over a century after the execution of Dara Shukoh, the Sirr-i-Akbar was translated into a mix of Latin, Greek, and Persian by the French traveling Indologist Abraham Hyacinthe Anquetil-Duperron in 1796, titling his version the Oupnek'hat or the Upanischada. The translation was then published in Strasbourg, c. 1801–1802, and represented the first European language translation of a major Hindu text while also causing a revival in Upanishadic studies in India. In the spring of 1814, the Latin translation by Anquetil-Duperron caught the eye of German philosopher Arthur Schopenhauer, who heralded the ancient text in two of his books, The World as Will and Representation (1819) and Parerga and Paralipomena (1851), stating:

From every sentence deep original and sublime thoughts arise, and a high and holy and earnest spirit pervades the whole. In the whole world there is no study so beneficial and so elevating as that of the Upanishads. It has been the solace of my life. It will be the solace of my death. [...] They are destined sooner or later to become the faith of the people.

The impact of the Upanishads on German idealist philosophers such as Schopenhauer and his contemporary Friedrich Wilhelm Joseph Schelling echoed into the United States with the Transcendentalists. Members of the movement such as Emerson and Thoreau embraced various aspects of the Naturphilosophie invented by Schelling, along with the exotic mysticism found in the Upanishads. The praise of these Americans further spread the fame of the Upanishads across the Western world. Irish poet W. B. Yeats read the Anquetil-Duperron rendition of the Sirr-i-Akbar and found the Latinized translation lofty and inaccessible; after meeting Shri Purohit Swami, Yeats endeavored to collaborate with him in translating the Upanishads into common English, resulting in their version: The Ten Principal Upanishads, published in 1938.

In the book The Argumentative Indian, Indian economist Amartya Sen notes that Anglo-Welsh scholar-philologist William Jones (who is credited for coining the term "Indo-European") first read the Upanishads via the Sirr-i-Akbar.

== See also ==
- Razmnama
- Ibadat Khana
