= The Ten Principal Upanishads =

English translation of Sanskrit texts

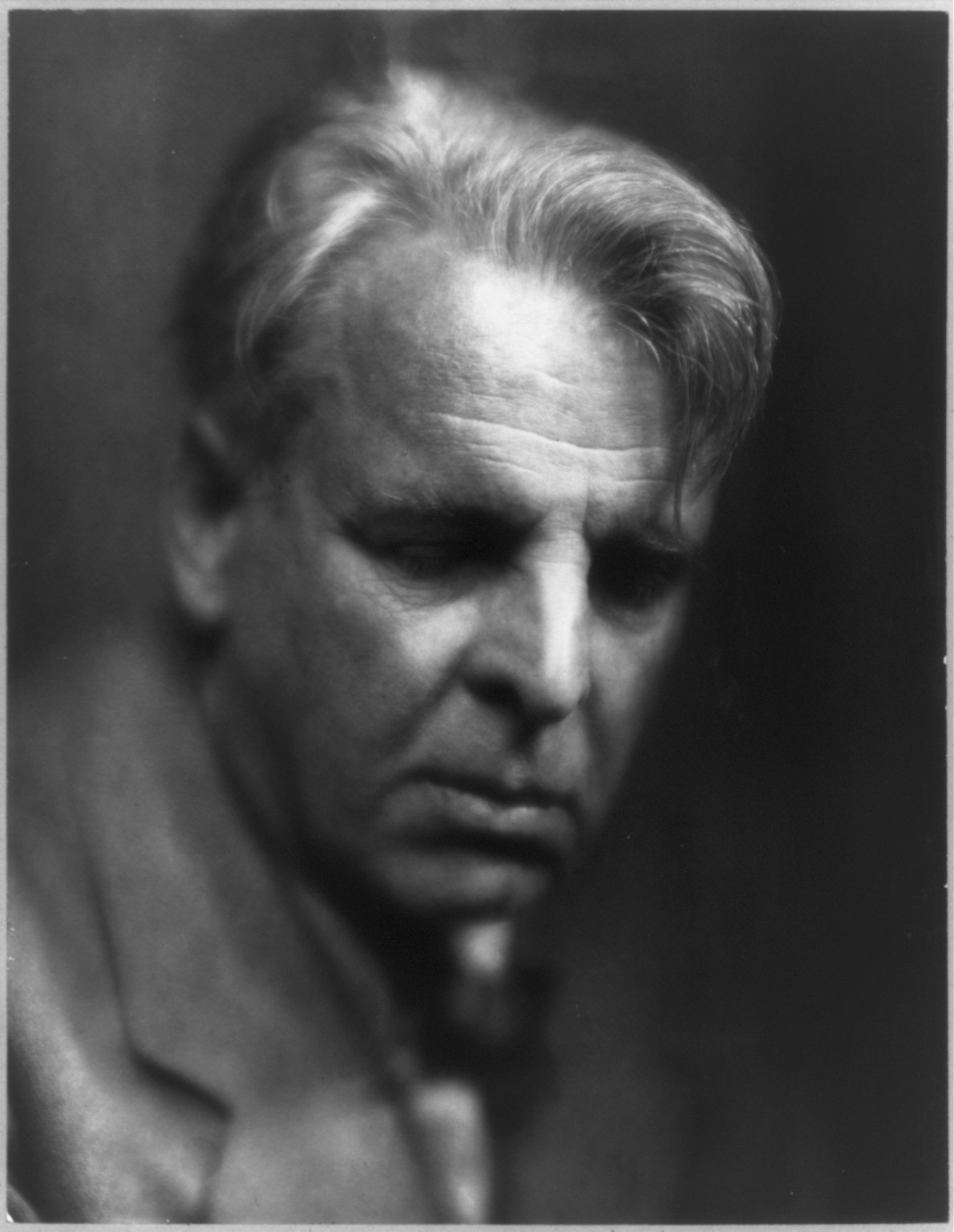
- Photograph of W. B. Yeats during the long translation process for him and Swami's version of the Upanishads, c. 1933.
- Author: W. B. Yeats; Shri Purohit Swami
- Language: English
- Published: 1938

The Ten Principal Upanishads is an English version of the Upanishads translated by the Irish poet W. B. Yeats and the Indian-born mendicant-teacher Shri Purohit Swami. The translation process occurred between the two authors throughout the 1930s and the book was published in 1938; it is one of the final works of W. B. Yeats.

== Background ==
Irish theosophist-writer George William Russell (also known as Æ) would often quote passages of the Upanishads to Yeats during their forty-year friendship and each time Yeats would say to himself: "Some day I will find out if he knows what he is talking about." The translations Yeats read (probably those by Anquetil-Duperron, themselves based on the Sirr-i-Akbar, a Persian version by the Mughal-mystic Dara Shukoh) left him incredulous, so upon meeting Shri Purohit Swami he proposed that the two of them translate the ancient text as though the original was written in common English, quoting the following line from Aristotle as part of his motivation:

To write well, express yourself like the common people, but think like a wise man.

W.B. Yeats could not travel to India as planned, so the bulk of translation took place on the Western Mediterranean island of Majorca between the years 1935-1936, with the book finally being published in 1938. This bulk was during a time of rejuvenation for the health and creativity of W.B. Yeats (following a Steinach operation in 1934, performed by Australian sexologist-physician Dr. Norman Haire), as he notes in a 1935 letter: "I find my present weakness made worse by the strange second puberty the operation has given me, the ferment that has come upon my imagination. If I write poetry it will be unlike anything I have done".

While Yeats only knew English, Shri Purohit Swami knew Sanskrit as well as English, Hindi, and Marathi. Yeats and Swami also communicated with one another via letters between the years 1931–1938. Although much of the correspondence concerns their translation of the Upanishads, W.B. Yeats also inquired about Shree Purohit Swami's life (including his nine-year pilgrimage across India) and the two shared conversation on many other topics, exhibiting a fond friendship cemented together by their mutual interests in mystical principles. On 28 January 1939, Yeats passed away in Menton, France, less than a year after the publication of his and Shri Purohit Swami's translation of the Upanishads.

== Contents ==
The chapters are listed as follows:

1. The Lord (Eesha-Upanishad)
2. At Whose Command? (Kena-Upanishad)
3. From the Kāthak Branch of the Wedas (Katha-Upanishad)
4. Questions (Prashna-Upanishad)
5. At the Feet of the Monk (Mundaka-Upanishad)
6. At the Feet of Master Mandooka (Māndookya-Upanishad)
7. From the Taittireeya Branch of the Wedas (Taittireeya-Upanishad)
8. At the Feet of Master Aitareya (Aitareya-Upanishad)
9. The Doctrine of the Chhāndôgyas (Chhāndôgya-Upanishad)
10. Famous Debates in the Forest (Brihadāranyaka-Upanishad)

== See also ==
- Mukhya Upanishads
- List of works by William Butler Yeats
