= Tomb of Nadira Begum =

Tomb in Lahore, Pakistan

- مقبرہ نادرہ بیگم
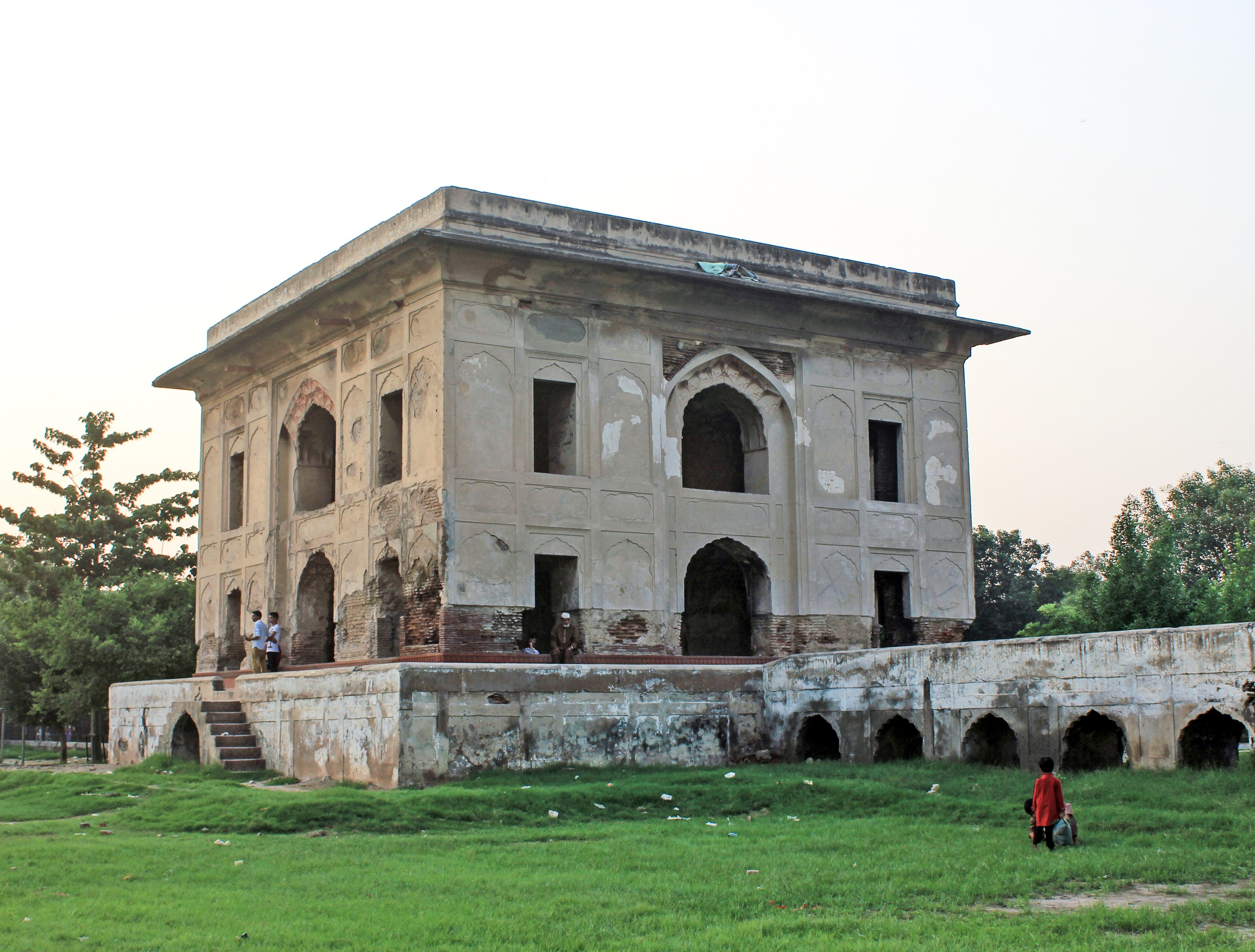
- Tomb of Nadira Begum
- Interactive map of the Tomb of Nadira Begum area

General information
- Type: Tomb
- Architectural style: Mughal
- Location: Lahore, Punjab Pakistan
- Coordinates: 31.5484°N 74.3620°E
- Construction started: 1693
- Completed: 1698
- Opened: 1698
- Client: Nadira Begum, Saima Begum, 5 others

Height
- Height: 32.6 feet (9.9 m)

Design and construction
- Architects: Aurangzeb, Hashim Mirza
- Main contractor: Dara Shikoh Aurangzeb

The Tomb of Nadira Begum (Urdu: مقبرہ نادرہ بیگم) is a Mughal era tomb in the city of Lahore, Pakistan, which houses the tomb of Mughal princess Nadira Banu Begum, wife of Prince Dara Shikoh.

== Background ==
Nadira was the wife of Dara Shikoh, who served as the governor of Lahore in the 1640s. In 1659, Dara was fighting his brother Aurangzeb for the Mughal throne. After Dara's defeat in the Battle of Deorai, he and his wife tried to flee to Iran through the Bolan Pass, but Nadira died of dysentery and exhaustion. Though Dara's troops were depleted, he sent his remaining soldiers to carry his wife's body from the pass to Lahore, to be buried near the shrine of Mian Mir, whom both considered to be their "spiritual guide".

== History ==
The tomb is believed to have been robbed of all costly marbles and semi-precious stones during Ranjit Singh's rule, leaving it in a "dilapidated" state. The tomb is also a prey to "contemporary vandalism" which is evident from the gaudy graffiti on the mausoleum "with the ugly plague of wall chalking".

== Architecture ==
Unlike other Mughal tombs, which are built in gardens, this tomb does not have a dome and was built in a sunken water tank. The tomb stands at the center of the tank on a raised platform. The tank was "200 by 200 Mughal gaz in size". Later, however the tank was converted into a Mughal garden. The corners of the tank were denoted by pavilions and the tomb could be accessed through "lofty gateways" on the north and south through a masonry bridge.

The bridge stands on thirty arches. The central chamber is 14 feet wide and is surrounded by an ambulatory. The square tomb measures 44 feet on each side and is 32 ft 6 in tall. The first storey is 13 feet and surrounded by square headed apertures. The stairs for reaching the upper storey are located in the northeast and southeast corners. The grave is 6 ft 10 in long, 2 ft 10 in wide and 1 ft 8 in high. Quranic verses are inscribed in Nastaliq script on a marble slab on the northern face of the grave.

== Gallery ==
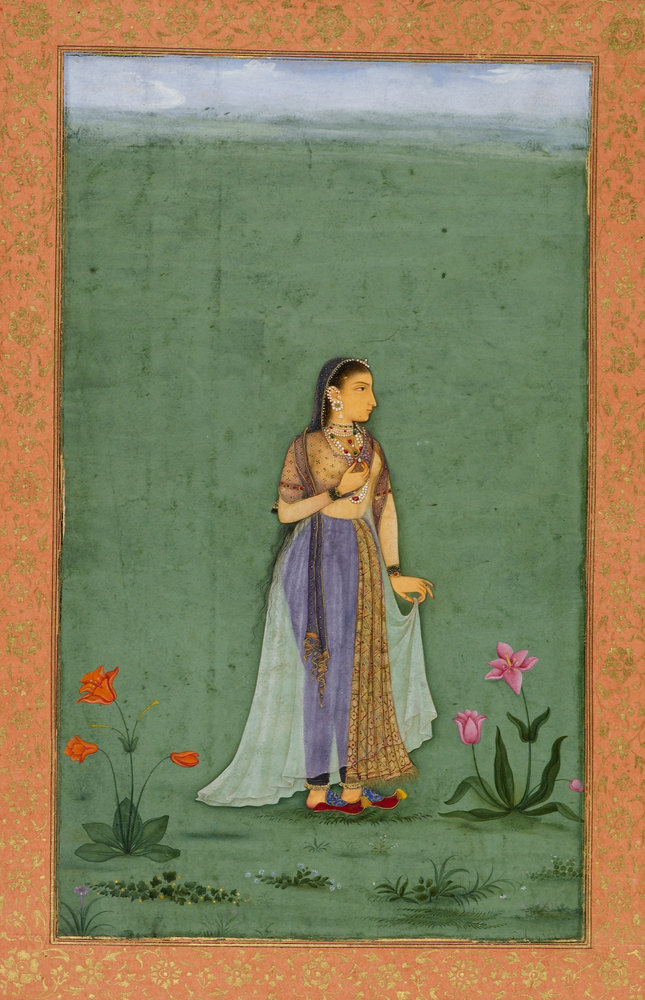
Princess Nadira Banu Begum

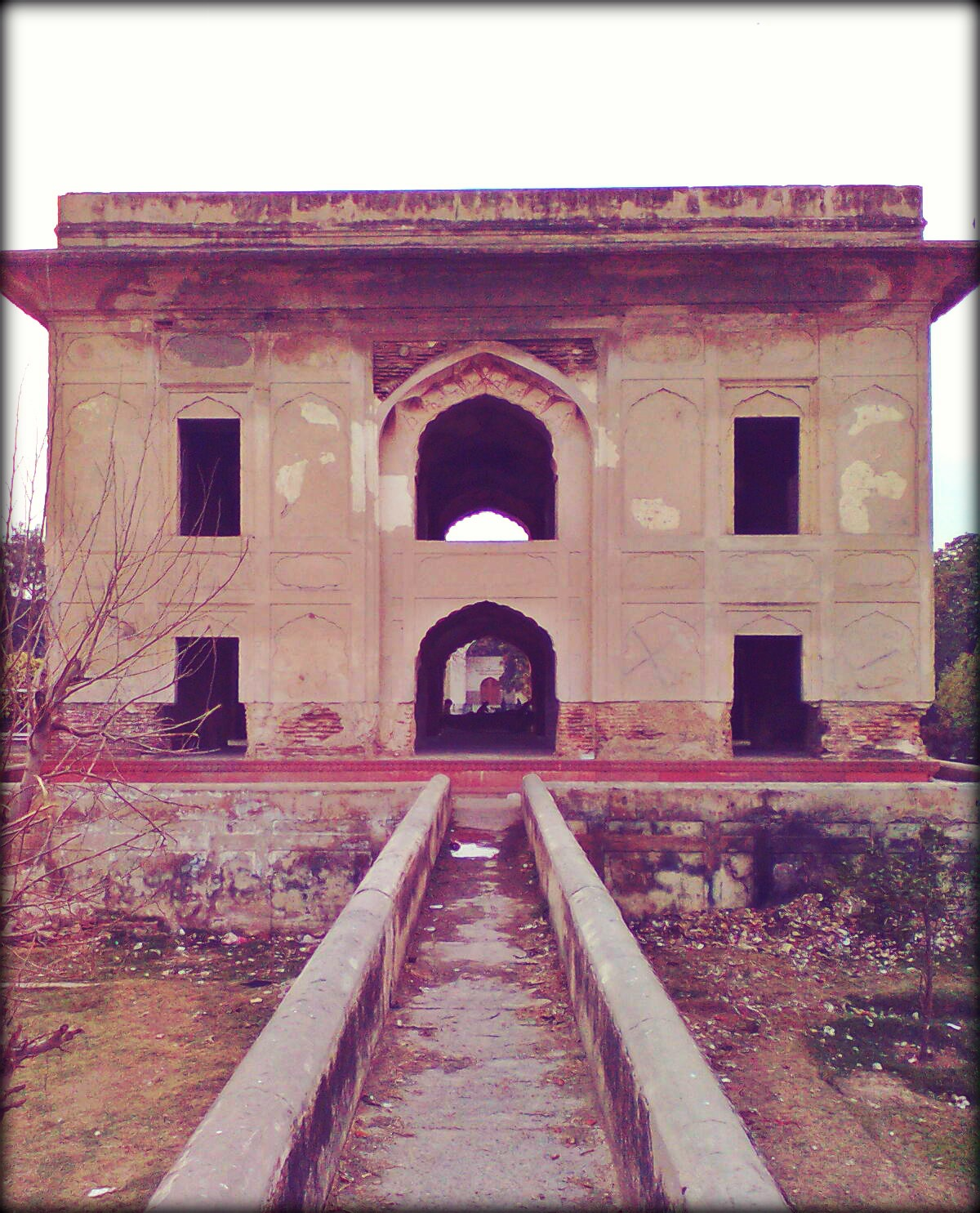
Tomb of Nadira Banu Begum

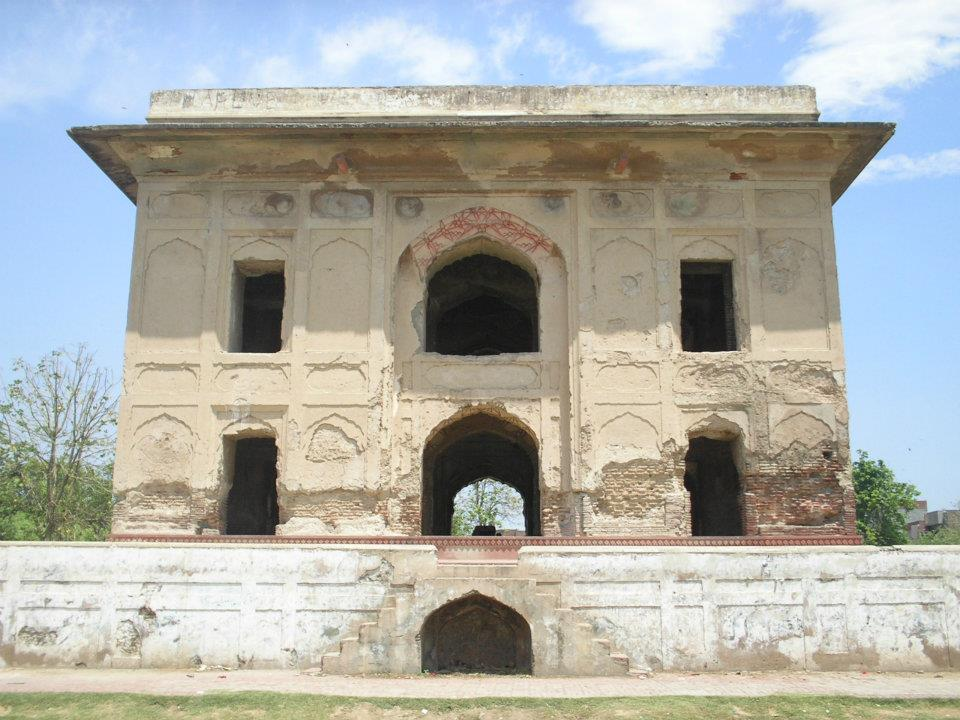
Tomb of Nadira Begum

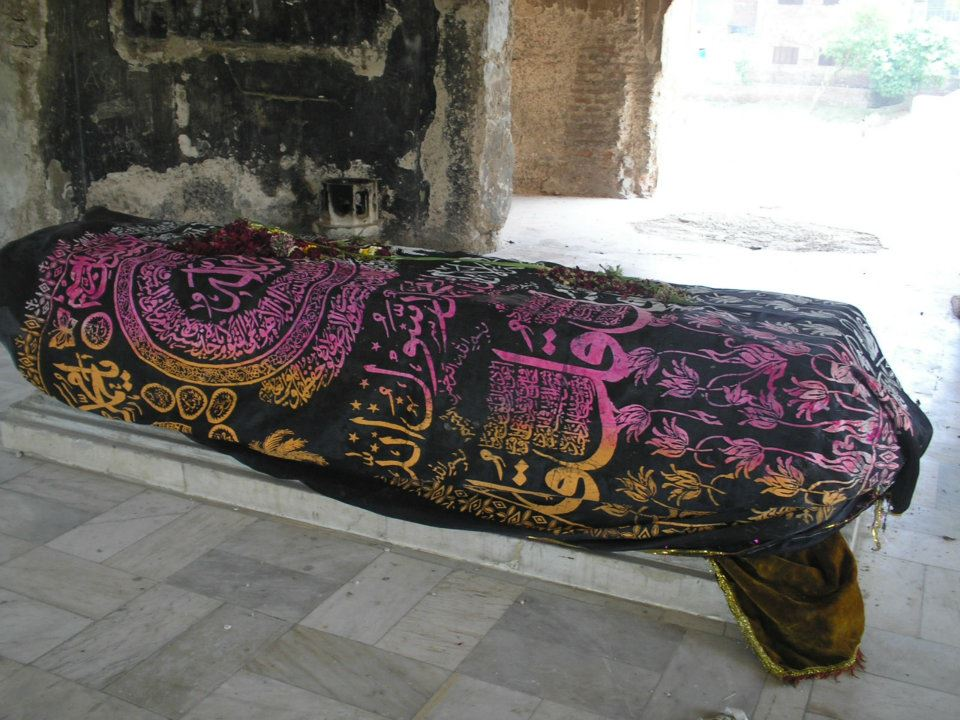
Grave of Nadira Begum

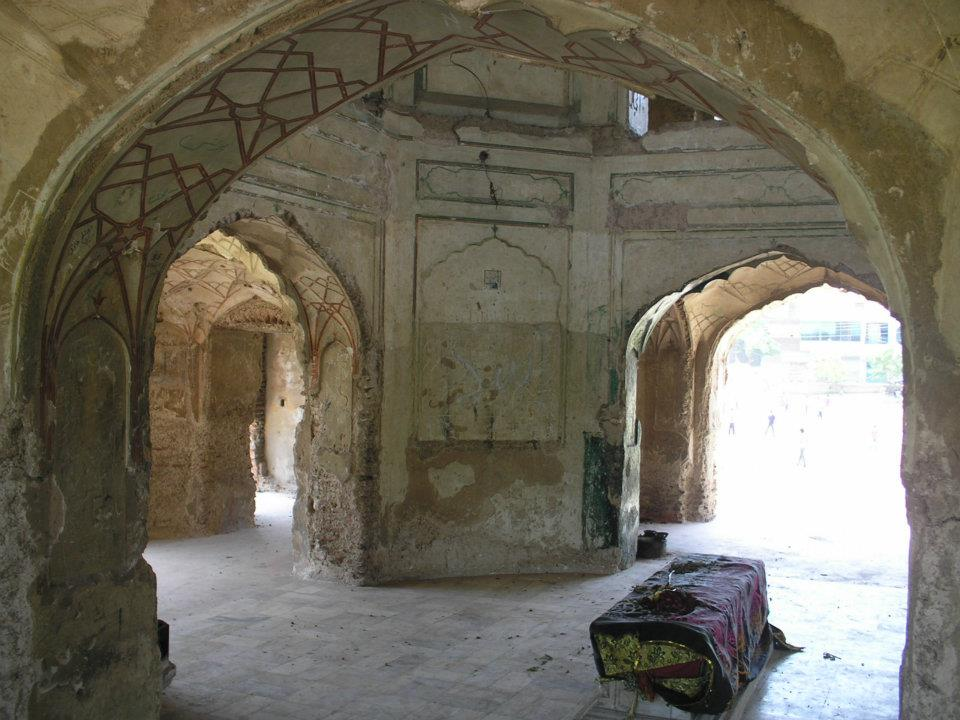
Interior of Tomb of Nadira Begum

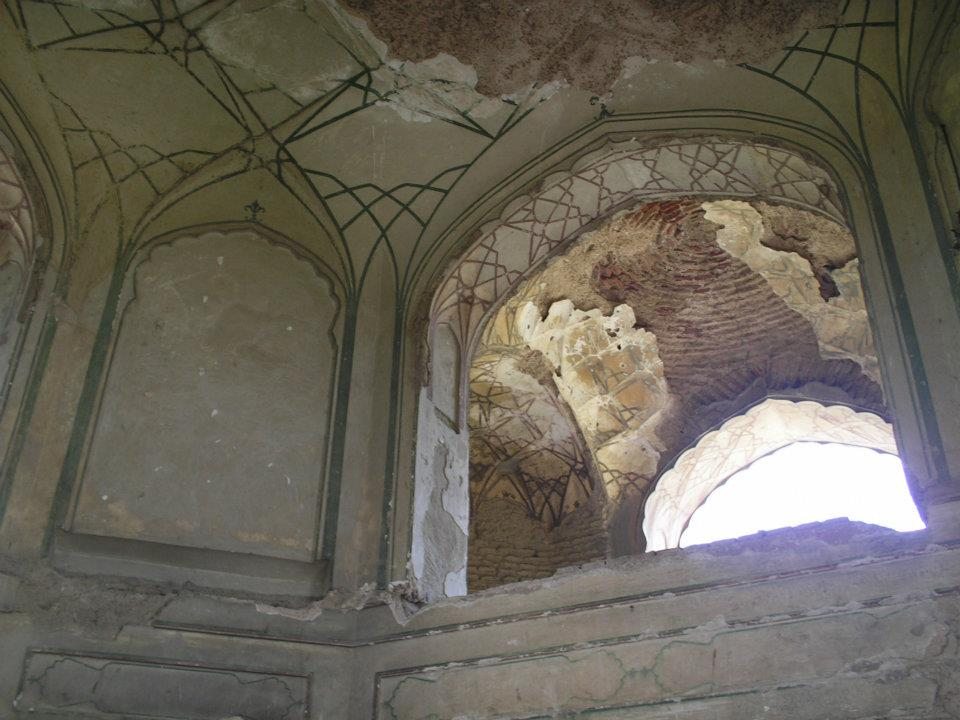
A window in Tomb of Nadira Begum

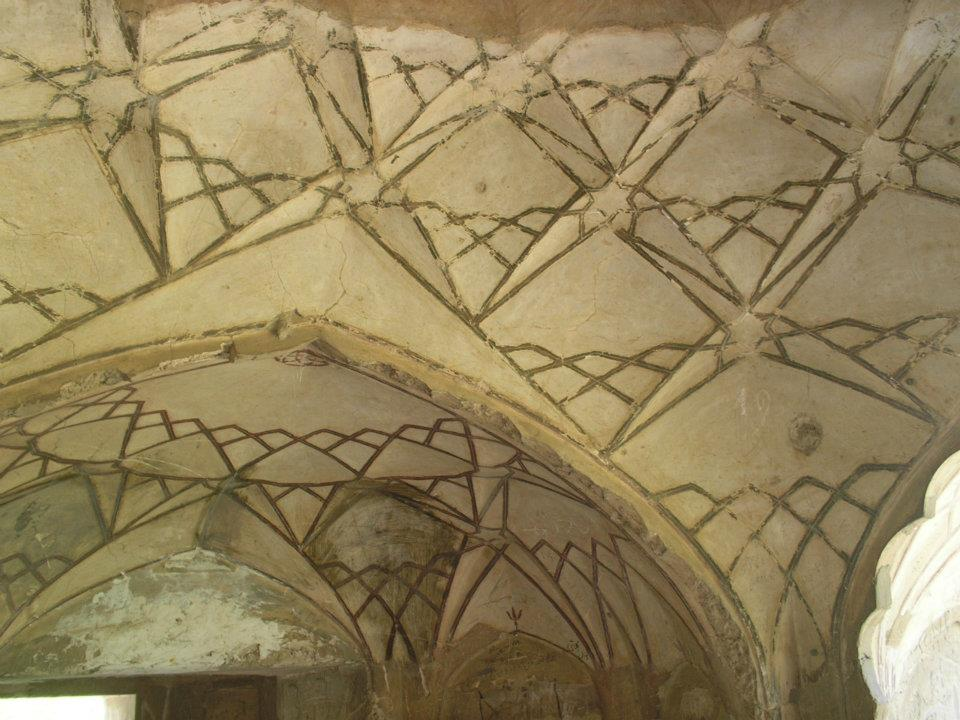
Ornaments in Tomb of Nadira Begum

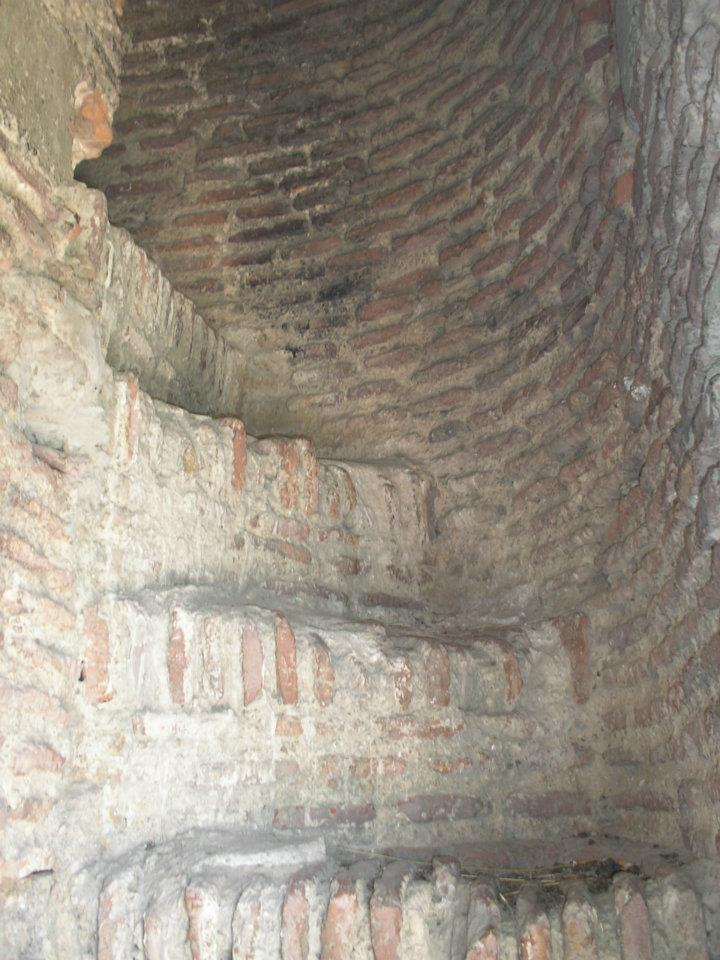
Stairs to the upper level in Tomb of Nadira Begum
