= Shyamal Gangapadhyay =

Indian writer and editor (1933–2001)

Shyamal Gangopadhay
- শ্যামল গঙ্গোপাধ্যায়
- Born: Shyamalendu-bikas Gangopadhyay; 25 March 1933; Khulna, Bengal Presidency, British India (now in Bangladesh)
- Died: 24 September 2001 (aged 68); Kolkata, West Bengal, India
- Education: Khulna Zila School; Ashutosh College; Charuchandra College
- Occupations: Novelist, editor, Author
- Spouse: Ity Gangopadhyay (Ity Sanyal)
- Children: Eldest daughter - Mallika Chowdhury(Married Poet Tushar Chowdhury). Youngest daughter Dr. Lalita Chatterjee (Gangopadhyay) (Married Samir Kumar Chattopadhyay).
- Relatives: Motilal Gangopadhyay (father). Kironmoyee devi (mother). Swami Pragyanananda Saraswati (maternal grand-uncle). Ashwini Mukhopadhyay (Maternal grand father). Girish Gangopadhyay (Paternal Grandfather). Tarun Ganguly (brother, former journalist). Tapash Ganguly (brother, former journalist).
- Writing career
- Language: Bengali
- Notable works: Shahzada Darashuko. Kuberer bishoy Ashoy (translated in english as "Possessions"). Haoya Gari.
- Notable awards: Sahitya Academy Award(1993)

Shyamal Gangapadhyay (25 March 1933 – 24 September 2001; Bengali: শ্যামল গঙ্গাপাধ্যায়) was a Bengali novelist, short story writer and editor born at Khulna (Present day Bangladesh). During Partition of India he and his family of 6 brothers, 1 sister, and his parents migrated to India as refugees. The immense toll of the forced migration on the family led to one of his brothers to commit suicide at his twenties. The financial and personal struggle of these years shaped Shyamal's literary landscape.

He received Sahitya Academy Award in 1993 for the novel of Shahjada Darasukoh, based on the life of Mughal Prince Dara Shukoh. He also wrote the story 'Vasco Da Gamar Bhaipo' and 'Parostri'.

== Early life ==
Gangapadhyay was born in Khulna, British India. His father name was Matilal Gangapadhyay and mother Kiranmoyee Devi. After the partition of 1947 their family came to India. Gangapadhyay was attracted towards student politics while studying in college. In the meanwhile he worked in a Steel factory in Belur. After completion of graduation in 1956, he also worked as teacher for few days in Mathuranath Bidyapith.

== Literary career ==
In 1960, Gangapadhyay started his journalist career in Anandabazar Patrika. Number of short stories were published in Anandabazar. His first novel Brihannala which was published as Arjuner Aggatobas and mostly admired novel Kubere Bishoy Ashoy in Desh. After 16 years of continuous service he left ABP house due to sudden confrontation with senior editor Santosh Kumar Ghosh and joined in Jugantar Patrika in 1976. He edited literary magazine Amrita. His epic novel Shahjada Darasukoh was published in Saptahik (Weekly) Bartaman Magazine, which was awarded Sahitya Academy in 1993. After retirement Gangapadhyay joined in Aajkaal daily magazine. His last novel was Ganga Ekti Nadir Naam. He wrote series of story of Sadhu Kalachand which is popular for teens. His novels were translated and published in various languages. He won Bibhutibhushan memorial award in recognition of his contribution to the Bengali literature and Gajendra Kumar Mitra memorial prize, Sarat Purashkar in 2000.

== Works ==
- Kuberer Bisoy Ashoy ( translation - Possessions )
- Shahjada Darasukoh (Vol I & II)
- Iswaritala Roopkatha
- Hawa Gari
- Swarger Ager Station
- Sadhu Kalachand Samagra (Vol I & II)
- Benche Thakar Swad
- Class 7er Mr. Bleck
- Alo Nei
- Jiban Rahassyo
- Jatin Darogar Betanto
- Valobasibona Ar
- Sudhamoyeer Dinlipi
- Durbiner Ultodike
- Vasco Da Gamar Vaipo
- Gatojanmer Rastai
- Amaltas
- Ganga Ekti Nadir Naam

== Death ==
Gangapadhyay was suffering from Brain Cancer and died at the age of 68 in Kolkata on 24 September 2001.
