= Rana Dil =

17th century concubine of Mughal prince Dara Shikoh

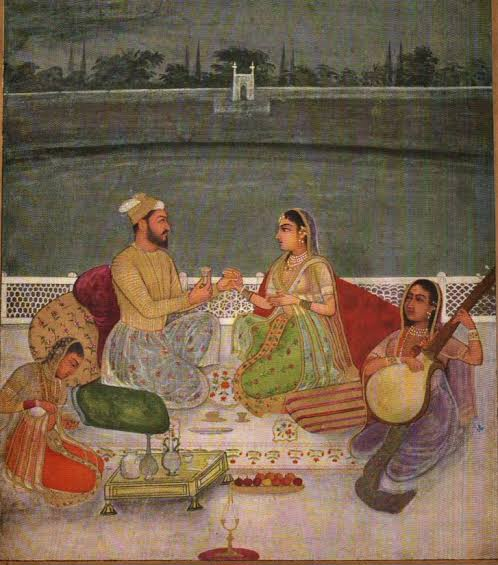
- Painting of Rana Dil and Dara Shikoh in the zenana, c.1658
- Born: Mughal Empire
- Died: 17th century

Rana Dil, also known as Gul Safeh (lit. "white rose") was a concubine of Mughal prince Dara Shikoh. She was of humble origin and later entered the imperial harem.

== Life ==
Gul Safeh was born as Rana Dil and was an orphan who worked as a dancer and singer on the streets of Delhi. She had caught the eye of the Prince Dara Shikoh who had fallen deeply in love with her. Emperor Shah Jahan was initially against their union but later allowed her to enter the palace as concubine upon Dara Shikoh's behest.

== After Dara Shikoh's defeat ==
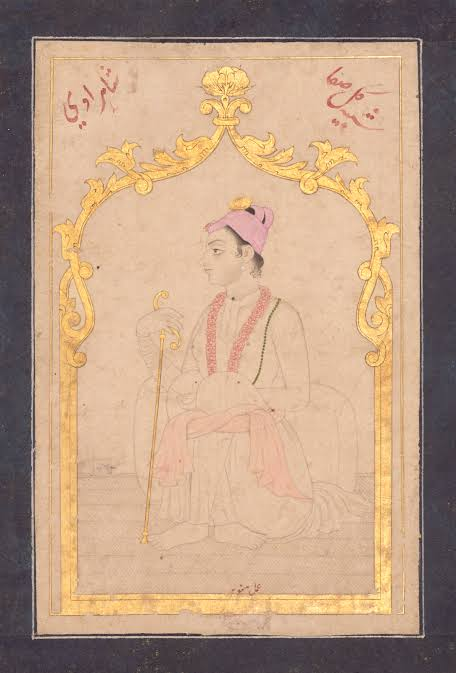
A portrait of Rana Dil, early 18th century.

On 10 August, 1659, Aurangzeb, having won the war of succession and become the new emperor, had Dara Shikoh executed on grounds of apostasy. Udaipuri Mahal, another concubine of Dara Shikoh, was taken into Aurangzeb's harem after Dara's defeat. Gul Safeh had on many occasions protested against joining the seraglio of the man who had killed her husband. She had tactfully asked him what it was that he found so special about her. When told that he was enamored with her beautiful hair, she chopped off all her hair, served it on a silver platter, and sent it to Aurangzeb. He then told her that he had fallen for her beautiful face, to which she slit and disfigured her face, and sent the bloody dagger to Aurangzeb. When Aurangzeb had come to understand that his efforts were fruitless, he had given up on the marriage with her he wished for and from then on gave her the respect and courtesy she deserved.
