= Shah Badakhshi =

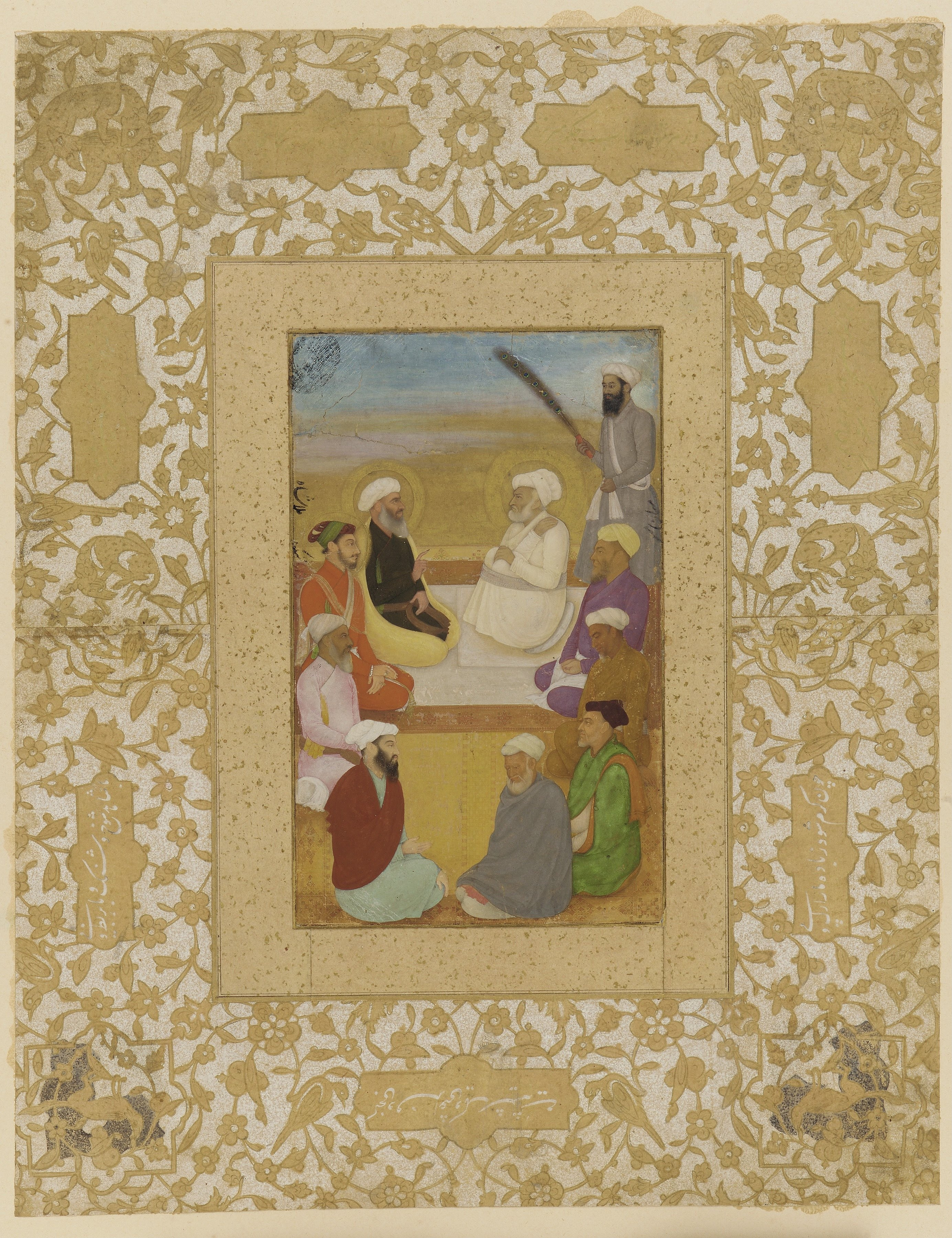
Dara Shikoh with Mian Mir and Mullah Shah Badakhshi, c. 1635

Mullah Shah Badakhshi, popularly known as Mullah Shah was a 17th-century Muslim Sufi, and spiritual successor of the famous Sufi saint Mian Mir (1550 – 1635). He was born to a Qazi in the village of Araska in the Rustaq area of Badakhshan (modern day Afghanistan) from which also his name is derived from. He belonged to the Qadiri order of Sufism. He was the spiritual mentor of the Mughal prince Dara Shikoh Qadri (1615 – 1659) and his sister Princess Jahanara Begum. Dara Shikoh desired to be initiated into the Qadri order at the hands of Mian Mir. After Mian Mir's death, Dara Shikoh's search for a murshid took him to Kashmir where he met Mulla Shah Badakhsi. In Sakinatul Awliya Dara Shikoh writes in the chapter titled "Mulla Shah Badakhsi":

"This faqir is his (Mulla Shah's) servant and disciple. His blessed name is Shah Muhammad. Hazrat Mian Mir used to call him Muhammad Shah and Mian Mir's disciples and devotees would refer to him as Hazrat Akhund."

Sai Abu Saeed Fateh Ullah Masoom Al-Gillani Al-Qadri (Mullah Shah) was the caliph and deputy of Sai Mian Mir Sahib. Abu Saeed was powerful cleric of Islamic Law and the pronounced professor of his times. His actual name was “Syed Fateh Ullah Gillani” and family name (patronymic identify) was Abu Saeed, his title was Khawaja Masoom, and Mulla Masoom, which was bestowed from threshold of Sai Mian Mir Sahib and Mulla Abu Saeed Khan also used in history references. He perceived the given title a component of the faith and overlooked all other names. That's why Mughal Crown Prince Dara Shikoh in his manuscript on Sai Mian Mir Sahib “Sakeenat ul-Awliya” at various places calls him “Abu Saeed”, “Mulla Saeed”, “Khwaja Masoom”, "Mulla Masoom", "Khan e Jahan", "Abu Saeed Khan", and "Khan e Khanan (chief of the chief)" are also available. Other authors also used titles like Makhdom ul Asr, and Makhdom ul Mashaikh etc.

In his institution, pupils from far boarded to fulfill the thirst of knowledge. Abu Saeed had two sons, Syed Saeed Ud Din Gillani, titled by “Surkh Poosh” (One who wore red clothes) was the elder one. He was mentally ill and acceptable close to Allah by birth. He was out of worldly dependency therefore never married. He was buried next to Abu Saeed.

Younger son was Syed Zain Ud Din Gillani Qadri renowned as Zain Ul Awliya, the one by whom, the genealogy of Abu Saeed is trickled down up till now. Abu Saeed had one daughter, Makhdoma Syeda Fatima Gillani who's married with Abu Saeed's nephew in Uchh Shreef.

Mian Mir remained practicing spirituality for three years at Abu Saeed's residence. Abu Saeed served Mian Mir day and night with great purity. He thanked Abu Saeed, as he was set to depart from Uchh Shreef, and said, whatever demanded should be granted ask Abu Saeed what do you need? Abu Saeed replied Hazrat! Seems tough to stay away from you, just want to be a plaintiff. Mian Mir accepted him in fealty and ordered him to first accomplish all responsibilities and tasks from Uchh Shreef and come to my permanent threshold Lahore.

Sai Makhdom Abu Saeed Syed Fateh Ullah Masoom left every thing and came to Lahore where Sai Mian Mir Sahib granted him the first ever deputyship (a caliph).
