= Dara Shikoh =

Mughal prince, author (1615–1659)

- Shahzada of the Mughal Empire; Padshahzada-i-Buzurg Martaba; Shah-e-Buland Iqbal; Timurid Prince; Mirza
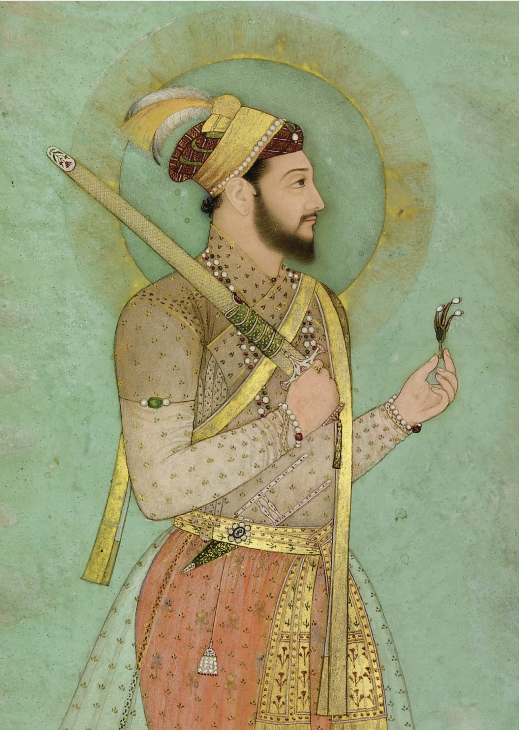
- Prince Dara Shikoh by Chitarman, c. 1654

Heir apparent of Mughal Empire
- Reign: 1633 – 31 July 1658

Subahdar of Multan
- Reign: 1652–1658
- Badshah: Shah Jahan

Subahdar of Kabul
- Reign: 1652–1658
- Badshah: Shah Jahan

Subahdar of Gujrat
- Reign: 1648–1658
- Badshah: Shah Jahan

Subahdar of Allahabad
- Reign: 1645–1658
- Badshah: Shah Jahan
- Born: 20 March 1615; Ajmer, Rajputana, Mughal Empire
- Died: 30 August 1659 (aged 44); Delhi, Mughal Empire
- Burial: Humayun's Tomb
- Spouse: Nadira Banu Begum (m. 1633; d. 1659)
- Issue: Sulaiman Shikoh; Mumtaz Shikoh; Sipihr Shikoh; Mihr Shah; Shahzadi Pak-Ni'had Banu Begum; Shahzadi Amal un-nisa Begum; Jahanzeb Banu Begum
Names
- Padshahzada-i-Buzurg Martaba, Jalal ul-Kadir Sultan Muhammad Dara Shikoh Shah-i-Buland Iqbal
- House: Mughal dynasty
- Dynasty: Timurid dynasty
- Father: Shah Jahan
- Mother: Mumtaz Mahal
- Religion: Sunni Islam

Dara Shikoh (20 March 1615 – 30 August 1659), also transliterated as Dara Shukoh, was the eldest son and heir-apparent of the Mughal emperor Shah Jahan. Dara was designated with the title Padshahzada-i-Buzurg Martaba (lit. 'Prince of High Rank') and was favoured as a successor by his father and his elder sister, Princess Jahanara Begum. He had been given the title of 'Shah-e-Buland Iqbal' by Shah Jahan. In the war of succession which ensued after Shah Jahan's illness in 1657, Dara was defeated by his younger brother Prince Muhiuddin (later, the Emperor Aurangzeb). He was executed in 1659 on Aurangzeb's orders after a bitter struggle for the imperial throne.

Dara was open to Hindu thought; he authored the work The Confluence of the Two Seas, which argues for the harmony of Sufi philosophy in Islam and Vedanta philosophy in Hinduism. A great patron of the arts, he was also more inclined towards philosophy and mysticism rather than military pursuits. He is often contrasted with his younger brother, Aurangzeb. The course of the history of the Indian subcontinent, had Dara Shikoh prevailed over Aurangzeb, has been a matter of some conjecture among historians.

== Early life ==
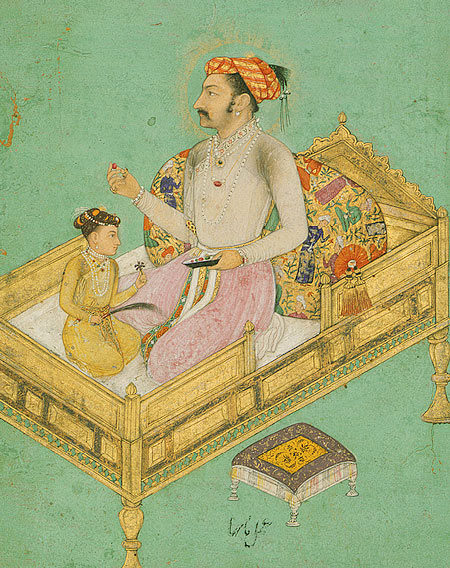
Young Prince Dara Shikoh, aged 4-5, with his father Shah Jahan by Nanha c.1620

Muhammad Dara Shikoh was born on 20 March 1615 in Ajmer, Rajasthan. He was the first son and third child of Prince Shahib-ud-din Muhammad Khurram and his second wife, Mumtaz Mahal. The prince was named by his father. 'Dara' means owner of wealth or star in Persian while the second part of the prince's name is commonly spelled in two ways: Shikoh (terror) or Shukoh (majesty or grandeur). Thus, Dara's full name can be translated as "Of the Terror of Darius" or "Of the Grandeur of Darius", respectively. Historian Ebba Koch favours 'Shukoh'.

Dara Shikoh had thirteen siblings of whom six survived to adulthood: Jahanara Begum, Shah Shuja, Roshanara Begum, Aurangzeb, Murad Bakhsh, and Gauhara Begum. He shared a close relationship with his sister, Jahanara. As part of his formal education, Dara studied the Quran, history, Persian poetry and calligraphy. He was also interested in Hindu thought, beliefs, and philosophy. Persian was Dara's native language, but he also learned Hindi, Arabic and later Sanskrit.

In October 1627, Dara's grandfather Emperor Jahangir died, and his father ascended the throne in January 1628 taking the regnal name 'Shah Jahan'. In 1633, Dara was appointed as the Vali-ahad (heir-apparent) to his father. He and his older sister Jahanara were Shah Jahan's favourite children.

== Marriage ==
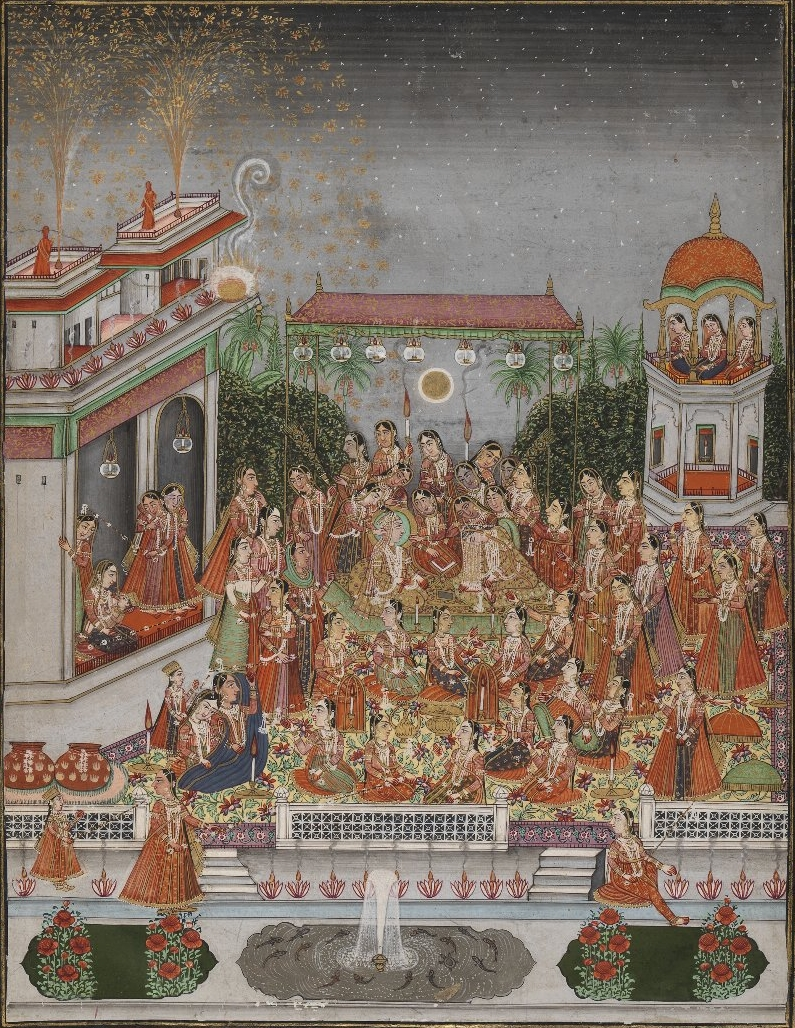
The marriage of Dara Shikoh and Nadira Begum, c.1875–90

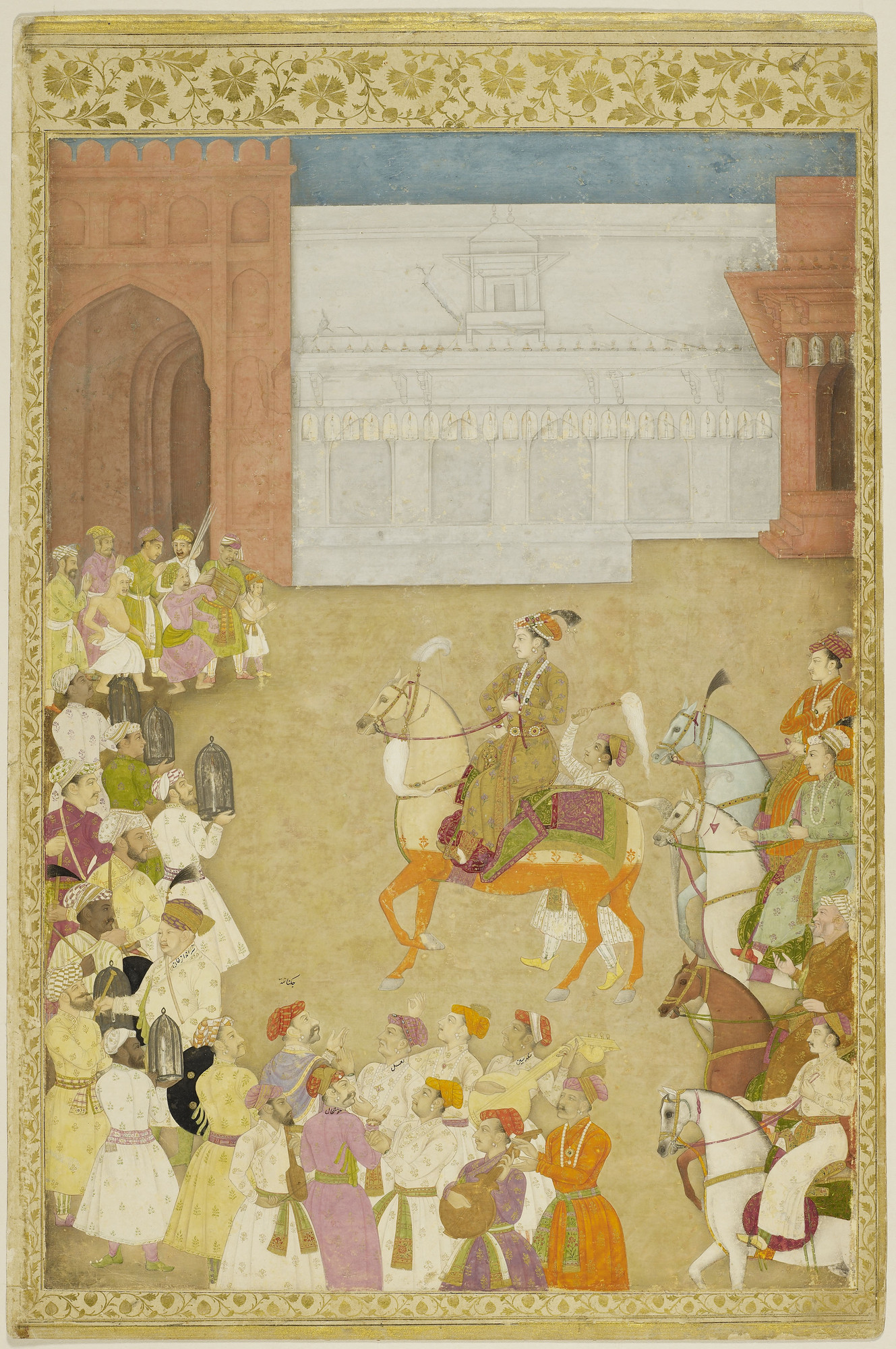
Wedding procession of Dara Shikoh, with Shah Shuja and Aurangzeb behind him. Royal Collection Trust, London.

During the lifetime of his mother Mumtaz Mahal, Dara Shikoh was betrothed to his half-cousin, Princess Nadira Banu Begum, the daughter of his paternal uncle Sultan Parvez Mirza. He married her on 1 February 1633 at Agra amidst great celebrations, pomp and grandeur. By all accounts, Dara and Nadira were devoted to each other and Dara's love for Nadira was so profound that unlike the usual practice of polygyny prevalent at the time, he never contracted any other marriage. The imperial couple had seven children together; among them three sons, Sulaiman Shikoh, Mumtaz Shikoh, and Sipihr Shikoh, and a daughter, Jahanzeb Banu Begum, survived to play important roles in future events.

A great patron of the arts, Dara ordered for the compilation of some refined artwork into an album which is now famous by the name of 'Dara Shikoh Album'. This album was presented by Dara to his wife, Nadira Banu Begum, in 1641. It is one of the few Mughal albums that have their original miniatures, calligraphy, and original covers intact.

Dara had at least two concubines, Gul Safeh (also known as Rana Dil) and Udaipuri Mahal (a Georgian or Armenian slave girl). Udaipuri later became a part of Aurangzeb's harem after her master's defeat.

== Military service ==
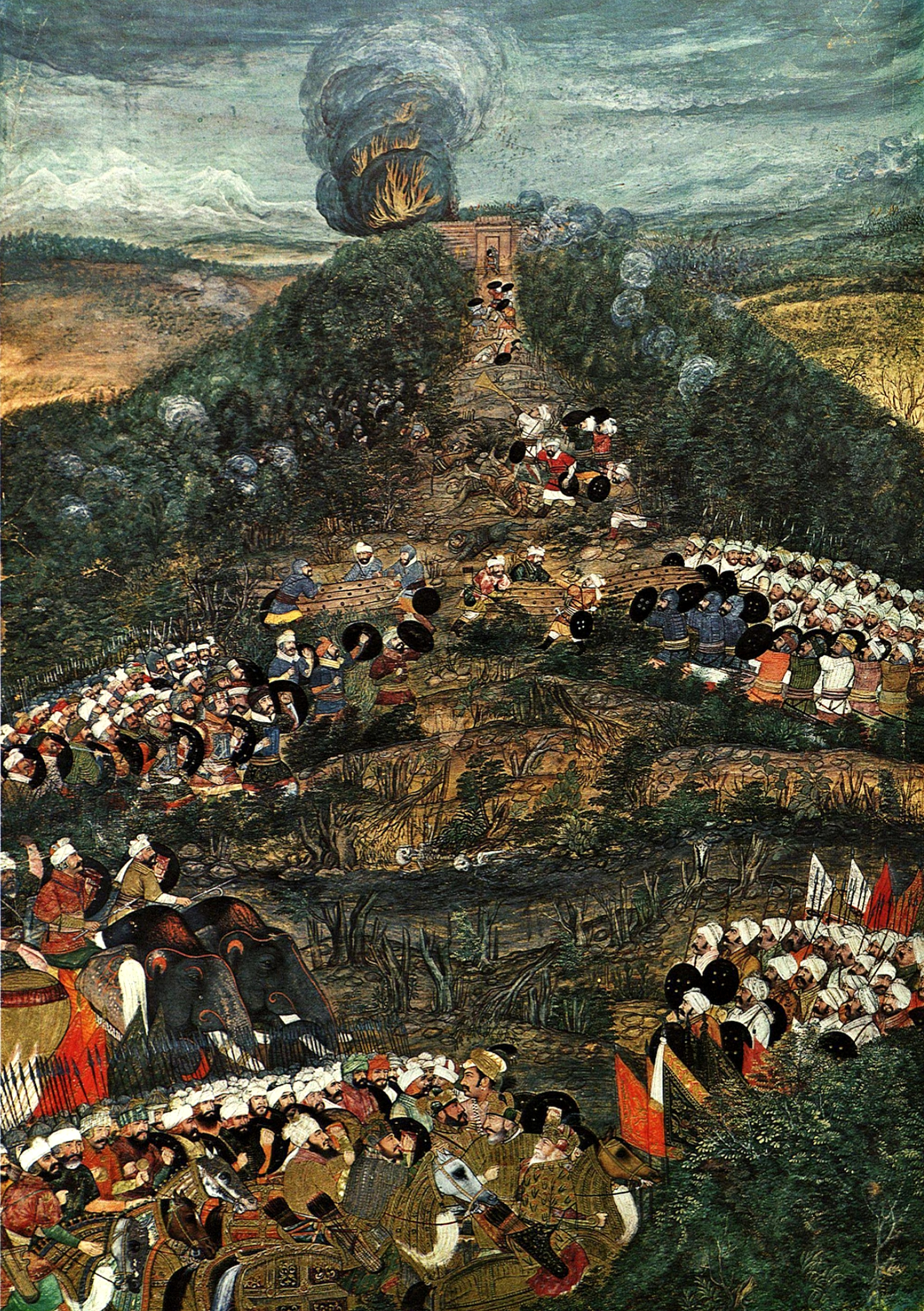
The failed Mughal Siege of Kandahar in 1653, led by Dara Shikoh. Attributed to Payag. Mughal, mid-17th century. Padshahnama.

On 10 September 1642, Shah Jahan formally confirmed Dara Shikoh as his heir, granting him the title of Shahzada-e-Buland Iqbal ("Prince of High Fortune") and promoting him to command of 20,000-foot and 20,000 horse. In 1645, he was appointed as subahdar (governor) of Allahabad. He was promoted to a command of 30,000-foot and 20,000 horse on 18 April 1648, and was appointed Governor of the province of Gujarat on 3 July.

== The struggle for succession ==
On 6 September 1657, the illness of emperor Shah Jahan triggered an armed power struggle among the four Mughal princes: Dara Shukoh, Shah Shuja, Aurangzeb, and Murad Baksh. Realistically, Dara Shikoh and Aurangzeb had the best chance of emerging victorious. Shah Shuja was the first to make his move, declaring himself Mughal Emperor in Bengal and marching towards Agra from the east. The brothers made various temporary alliances with each other and fought over the next two years. Dara Shukoh fought with Aurangzeb in two major battle: The Battle of Dharmat and the Battle of Samugarh.

Aurangzeb decisively defeated Dara Shukoh at Samugarh in 1658. Dara fled from the battle scene and soon left Shahjahanabad, leaving the capital city to Aurangzeb. An Afghan ally of Aurangzeb captured Dara Shukoh in 1659 and sent him to Shahjahanabad as Aurangzeb's prisoner.

== Intellectual pursuits ==
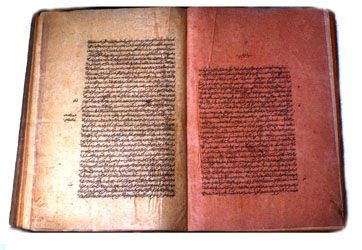
A page from the Majma-ul-Bahrain, Victoria Memorial, Calcutta.

Dara Shikoh is widely renowned as interested in the Hindu traditions of the Indian subcontinent. He was an erudite champion of mystical religious speculation and a poetic diviner of syncretic cultural interaction among people of all faiths. This made him a heretic in the eyes of his younger brother and a suspect eccentric in the view of many of the worldly power brokers swarming around the Mughal throne. Dara Shikoh was a follower of the Armenian Sufi-perennialist mystic Sarmad Kashani, as well as Lahore's famous Qadiri Sufi saint Mian Mir, whom he was introduced to by Mullah Shah Badakhshi (Mian Mir's spiritual disciple and successor). Mian Mir was so widely respected among all communities that he was invited to lay the foundation stone of the Golden Temple in Amritsar by the Sikhs.

Dara Shikoh subsequently developed a friendship with the seventh Sikh Guru, Guru Har Rai. Dara Shikoh devoted much effort towards finding a common mystical language between Islam and Hinduism. Towards this goal he completed the translation of fifty Upanishads from their original Sanskrit into Persian in 1657 so that they could be studied by Muslim scholars. His translation is often called Sirr-i-Akbar ("The Greatest Mystery"), where he states boldly, in the introduction, his speculative hypothesis that the work referred to in the Qur'an as the "Kitab al-maknun" or the hidden book, is none other than the Upanishads. His most famous work, Majma-ul-Bahrain ("The Confluence of the Two Seas"), was also devoted to a revelation of the mystical and pluralistic affinities between Sufic and Vedantic speculation. The book was authored as a short treatise in Persian in 1654–55.

Annemarie Schimmel notes that Dara Shikoh remained committed to the fundamentals of Islam and repeatedly identified himself as a Hanafi Qadiri. His own writings contain explicit statements of divine unity. In the opening verses of the Majma-ul-Bahrain, he quotes the Persian Sufi poet Hakim Sanai, whose verse declares that God is "One and none shares His kingship". The same passage includes a separate quatrain attributed to Dara himself, ending with the words "whatever name there is, it is one of the names of God".

In 1006 A.H, the prince had commissioned a translation of Yoga Vasistha, after both Vasistha and Rama appeared in his dream. Translation was undertaken by Nizam al-Din Panipati and came to be known as the Jug-Basisht, which has since become popular in Persia among intellectuals interested in Indo-Persian culture. The Safavid-era mystic Mir Findiriski (d. 1641) commented on selected passages of Jug-Basisht.

The library established by Dara Shikoh still exists on the grounds of Ambedkar University, Kashmiri Gate, Delhi, and is now run as a museum by Archaeological Survey of India after being renovated.

== Patron of arts ==
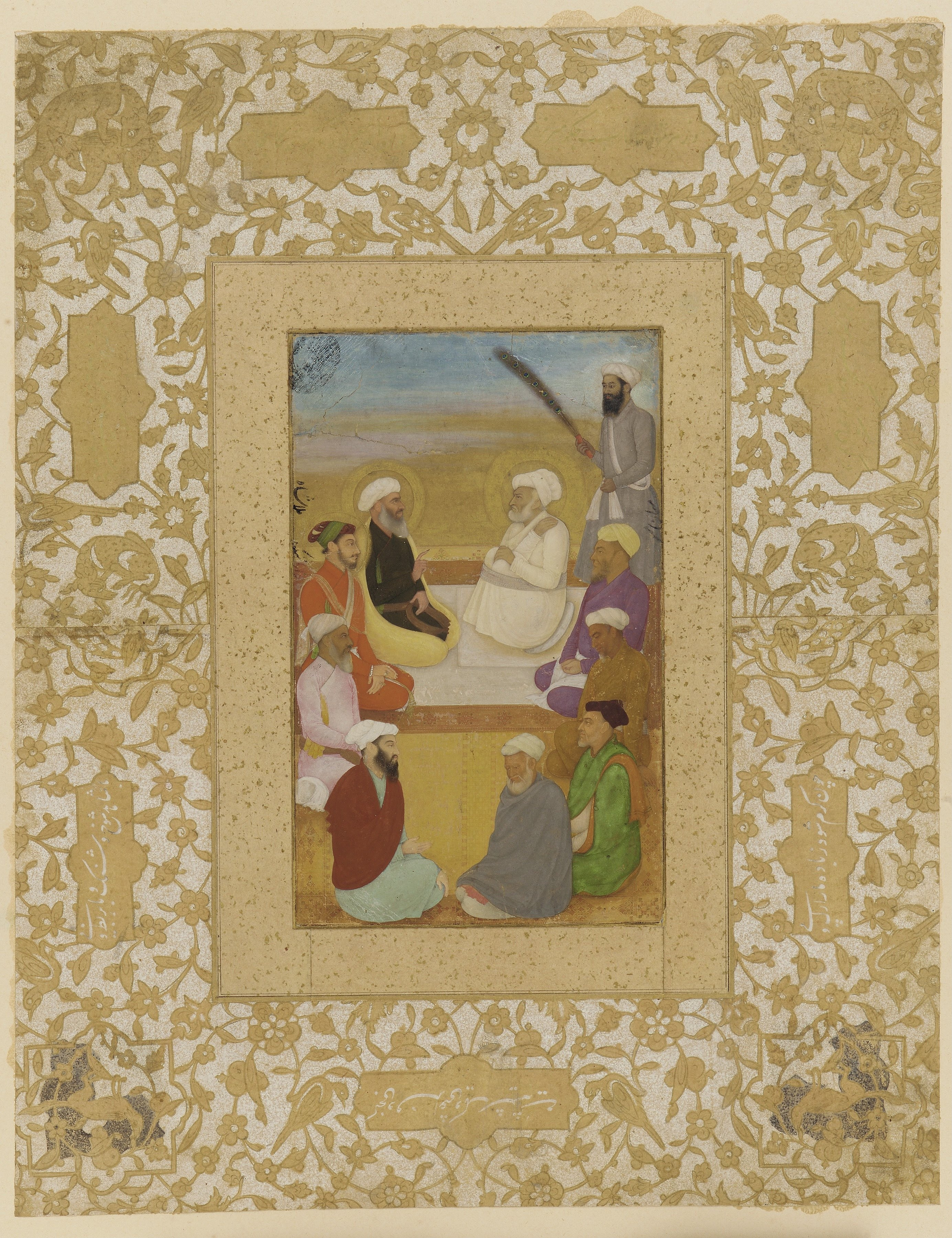
Dara Shikoh with Mian Mir and Mullah Shah Badakhshi by Lalchand c.1635

He was also a patron of fine arts, music and dancing, a trait frowned upon by his younger sibling Muhiuddin, later the Emperor Aurangzeb. The 'Dara Shikoh' is a collection of paintings and calligraphy assembled from the 1630s until his death. It was presented to his wife Nadira Banu in 1641–42 and remained with her until her death after which the album was taken into the royal library and the inscriptions connecting it with Dara Shikoh were deliberately erased; however not everything was vandalised and many calligraphy scripts and paintings still bear his mark.

Among the existing paintings from the Dara Shikoh Album, are two facing pages, compiled in the early 1630s just before his marriage, showing two ascetics in yogic postures, probably meant to be a pair of yogis, Vaishnava and Shaiva. These paintings are attributed to the artist Govardhan. The album also contains numerous pictures of Muslim ascetics and divines and the pictures obviously reflect Dara Shikoh's interest in religion and philosophy.

Dara Shikoh is also credited with the commissioning of several exquisite, still extant, examples of Mughal architecture – among them the tomb of his wife Nadira Begum in Lahore, the Shrine of Mian Mir also in Lahore, the Dara Shikoh Library in Delhi, the Akhund Mullah Shah Masjid in Srinagar in Kashmir and the Pari Mahal garden palace (also in Srinagar in Kashmir).

== Death and aftermath ==
After the defeat, Dara Shikoh retreated from Agra to Delhi and thence to Lahore. His next destination was Multan and then Thatta (Sindh). From Sindh, he crossed the Rann of Kachchh and reached Kathiawar, where he met Shah Nawaz Khan, the governor of the province of Gujarat who opened the treasury to Dara Shikoh and helped him to recruit a new army. He occupied Surat and advanced towards Ajmer. Foiled in his hopes of persuading the fickle but powerful Rajput feudatory, Maharaja Jaswant Singh of Marwar, to support his cause, Dara Shikoh decided to make a stand and fight the relentless pursuers sent by Aurangzeb, but was once again comprehensively routed in the battle of Deorai (near Ajmer) on 11 March 1659. After this defeat he fled to Sindh and sought refuge under Malik Jeevan (Junaid Khan Barozai), an Afghan chieftain, whose life had on more than one occasion been saved by the Mughal prince from the wrath of Shah Jahan. However, Junaid held Dara Shikoh by his wrist and seized him. Then he gave the news to Aurangzeb that he had captured Dara Shikoh. Aurangzeb sent his army to Malik Jeevan's place. Aurangzeb's army captured Dara Shikoh on 10 June 1659.

Dara Shikoh was brought to Delhi, placed on a filthy elephant and paraded through the streets of the capital in chains. Dara Shikoh's fate was decided by the political threat he posed as a prince popular with the common people – a convocation of nobles and clergy, called by Aurangzeb in response to the perceived danger of insurrection in Delhi, declared him a threat to the public peace and an apostate from Islam. He was killed by four of Aurangzeb's henchmen in front of his terrified son on the night of 30 August 1659 (9 September Gregorian). After his death at the age of 44, the remains of Dara Shikoh were buried in an unidentified grave in Humayun's tomb in Delhi.

Niccolao Manucci, the Venetian traveler who worked in the Mughal court, has written down the details of Dara Shikoh's death. According to him, upon Dara's capture, Aurangzeb ordered his men to have his head brought up to him and he inspected it thoroughly to ensure that it was Dara indeed. He then further mutilated the head with his sword three times. After which, he ordered the head to be put in a box and presented to his ailing father, Shah Jahan, with clear instructions to be delivered only when the old King sat for his dinner in his prison. The guards were also instructed to inform Shah Jahan that, "King Aurangzeb, your son, sends this plate to let you (Shah Jahan) see that he does not forget you". Shah Jahan instantly became happy (not knowing what was in store in the box) and uttered, "Blessed be God that my son still remembers me". Upon opening the box, Shah Jahan became horrified and fell unconscious.

== Quest for the tomb ==
Humayun's Tomb, where the remains of Dara Shikoh were interred.

The exact burial location of Dara Shikoh remained a mystery for over two centuries until 2020, when Sanjeev Kumar Singh, an engineer at the South Delhi Municipal Corporation (SDMC), identified the grave among several marked and unmarked graves in Humayun's Tomb in Delhi. Singh's discovery has garnered attention from the likes of Irfan Habib, B.R. Mani, and K. K. Muhammed.

After four years of research, Singh concluded Dara Shikoh's grave is under one of the three unmarked cenotaphs in the northwestern chamber beneath the dome of Humayun's Tomb.

His claim is based on the Alamgirnama, a biography of Aurangzeb, which mentions that Dara Shikoh was buried below the dome of Humayun's Tomb, alongside Akbar's sons, Danyal and Murad. The relevant passage from the Alamgirnama was translated for Singh by Prof. Aleem Ashraf Khan, Head of the Persian Department at Delhi University. Additionally, Singh has studied the architectural style of the cenotaphs, which he argues aligns with the period of Dara Shikoh's death.

=== Archaeologists' views on Singh's research ===
On 26 February 2020, the Government of India, through the Archaeological Survey of India (ASI), initiated a project to identify Dara Shikoh's grave from among the 140 graves in the 120 chambers inside Humayun's Tomb. The effort is considered challenging due to the absence of identifying inscriptions on the graves. At least five of the seven members have acknowledged and supported Sanjeev Kumar Singh's research, agreeing that he had correctly identified the grave of Dara Shikoh. The members supporting Singh's findings include retired ASI Additional Director General Dr. B.R. Mani, retired ASI Joint Director General Dr. K.N. Dikshit, retired ASI Director Northern Region Padma Shri K. K. Muhammed, retired ASI Director of the School of Archaeology B.M. Pande, and retired ASI Director of Epigraphy (Arabic and Persian) Dr. G.S. Khwaja. These experts have recognized Singh's research as credible, aligning with historical and architectural evidence.

Comments from other members, except for Former ASI Director (Archaeology) Syed Jamal Hassan, are not publicly known as the report has not yet been released. Dr. Hassan has expressed doubts, citing the lack of inscriptions and confirming references. Following a Right to Information query in 2021, the ASI responded that it had not yet found Dara Shikoh's grave. In March 2021, the then culture Minister Mr. Prahlad Sigh Patel stated in the Rajya Sabha that the committee was studying Dara Shikoh's heritage, but the final report is still awaited. However, Senior Archaeologist and former Director of the School of Archaeology of Archaeological Survey of India, Shri B.M. Pande has said that "Dara's grave has been identified."

=== Historians' views on Singh's research ===
Several internationally renowned historians specializing in medieval Mughal India have also supported Singh's claim. Padma Bhushan Irfan Habib, Professor Emeritus at Aligarh Muslim University, stated, "I am not an archaeologist or indeed an architect myself, but as far as I can comprehend, the identification of Dara Shikoh's grave seems to be quite definitive and should secure general acceptance."

Former Head of the History Department at Jawaharlal Nehru University, Prof. Harbans Mukhia, commented, "He appears to have definitively and decisively located the grave of Dara Shikoh, which was always known to be located in Humayun's Tomb. He has examined his quarry from every angle—the textual evidence, the architectural features, the meaning of the exact placement of the tomb—and visited the site several times to be certain of his search. At the end of it, he has given proof of the grave's location with no reasonable doubt left."

Farhat Nasreen, Head of the Department of History at Jamia Millia Islamia, praised the research, saying, "His research is very fascinating; it is remarkable that through his relentless hard work, he has solved one of the biggest mysteries."

Prof. S.H. Qasemi, former Head of the Department of Persian at the University of Delhi, expressed his agreement with Singh's findings, stating, "I have myself gone through the reference to Dara Shukoh's burial in the Alamgirnama and also saw the location identified by Sanjeev in Humayun's Tomb. I can confirm that the location of the grave identified by him completely matches the description of Dara Shukoh's burial place in the Alamgirnama."

Singh has delivered lectures on his findings and research regarding the grave of Dara Shikoh at various esteemed institutions, including Jamia Millia Islamia (JMI), the India International Centre (IIC), and the Indira Gandhi National Centre for the Arts.

His research paper, "दारा शुकोह की क़ब्र की खोज - एक अध्ययन" (In the Search of Dara Shukoh's Tomb - A Study), has been published in Purapravah, an international journal of archaeology and history published in Hindi by the Indian Archaeological Society.

== Tributes ==
- In 2017, the New Delhi Municipal Council (NDMC) decided to rename central Delhi's Dalhousie Road to Dara Shikoh Road in his honor.
- Partition Museum and Dara Shukoh Library Cultural Hub: Originally built in 1637 CE as a library by Dara Shikoh himself, the building was later repurposed by the Government of India into a partition museum. This is India's second partition museum, following the one in Amritsar.
- Dara Shikoh digital library: All written works by and about Dara Shikoh are now digitally accessible through this library, thanks to the recommendations of the AMU Centenary Dara Shikoh Conference held in December 2021, New Delhi.

== In popular culture ==
- He is also a character played by Vaquar Sheikh in the 2005 Bollywood film Taj Mahal: An Eternal Love Story, directed by Akbar Khan.
- Dara Shikoh is the name of the protagonist of Mohsin Hamid's 2000 novel Moth Smoke, which reimagines the story of his trial unfolding in contemporary Pakistan.
- Bengali writer Shyamal Gangapadhyay wrote a novel on his life Shahjada Dara Shikoh which received the Sahitya Academy Award in 1993.
- In the 2011-2012 Indian historical TV serial Veer Shivaji, he is portrayed by Aarav Chowdhary.
- Dara Shikoh award awarded by Indo-Iranian society. Sheila Dixit former Delhi CM (1998–2013) was a recipient in 2010.

== Governorship ==
- Lahore 1635–1636
- Illahabad 1645–1647
- Malwa 1642–1658
- Gujarat 1648
- Multan, Kabul 1652–1656
- Bihar 1657–1659

== Ancestry ==
Ancestors of Dara Shikoh

8. Jalal-ud-din Muhammad Akbar, Mughal Emperor
4. Nur-ud-din Muhammad Jahangir, Mughal Emperor
9. Mariam-uz-Zamani
2. Shahab-ud-din Muhammad Shah Jahan I, Mughal Emperor
10. Udai Singh, Raja of Marwar
5. Jagat Gosain
11. Manrang Devi of Gwalior
1. Dara Shikoh
12. I'timad-ud-Daulah
6. Abu'l-Hasan Asaf Khan
13. Asmat Begam
3. Mumtaz Mahal
14. Ghias ud-din 'Ali Asaf Khan
7. Diwanji Begum

== Works ==
- Writings on Sufism and the lives of awliya (Muslim saints):
  - Safinat ul- Awliya
  - Sakinat ul-Awliya
  - Risala-i-Haq-Numa
  - Tariqat ul-Haqiqat
  - Hasanaat ul-'Aarifin
  - Iksir-i 'Azam (Diwan-e-Dara Shikoh)
- Writings of a philosophical and metaphysical nature:
  - Majma-ul-Bahrain (The Mingling of Two Oceans)
  - So’aal o Jawaab bain-e-Laal Daas wa Dara Shikoh (also called Mukaalama-i Baba Laal Daas wa Dara Shikoh)
  - Sirr-i-Akbar (The Great Secret, his translation of the Upanishads in Persian)
  - Persian translations of the Yoga Vasishta and Bhagavad Gita.

== See also ==
- Dara Shikoh Road
- Majma-ul-Bahrain
- Sirr-i-Akbar
- Mughal–Safavid War (1649–1653)
- Akbar
- Nur Jahan

== Bibliography ==
- Ebrahim, Alireza; Khodaverdian, Shahram (2018). "Dārā Shukūh". In Madelung, Wilferd; Daftary, Farhad (eds.). Encyclopaedia Islamica Online. Brill Online. ISSN 1875-9831.
- Eraly, Abraham (2004). The Mughal Throne: The Saga of India's Great Emperors. Phoenix, London. ISBN 0753817586.
- Gandhi, Supriya (2020). The Emperor who Never was. New Haven: Yale University Press.
- Hansen, Waldemar [1986]. The Peacock Throne: The Drama of Mogul India. Orient Book Distributors, New Delhi.
- Mahajan, V.D. (1978). History of Medieval India. S. Chand.
- Sarkar, Jadunath (1984). A History of Jaipur. Orient Longman, New Delhi.
- Sarkar, Jadunath (1962). A Short History of Aurangzib, 1618–1707. M. C. Sarkar and Sons, Calcutta.
- Sarker, Kobita (2007). Shah Jahan and his paradise on earth: the story of Shah Jahan's creations in Agra and Shahjahanabad in the golden days of the Mughals. K.P. Bagchi & Co. ISBN 9788170743002.
