= Allopanishad =

16th-century Indian text of uncertain origin

Allah Upanishad, or Allopanishad, is a apocryphal and a controversial text of uncertain origin written during Muslim rule of the Mughal emperor Akbar in India in 16th century. This is unique because it blends Hindu philosophical concepts with Islamic terminology—specifically, by using the word "Allah" to describe the Supreme Divine Power.

== Terminology ==
The name Allopanishad is a portmanteau: Allah (Arabic for God) + Upanishad (Sanskrit for "sitting near," referring to a genre of Hindu philosophical texts). The text is also referred to as the Allah Upanishad or Muhammad Upanishad.

Swami Dayananda Saraswati's book Satyarth Prakash (The Light of Truth) argues that the Allopanishad is not part of the Upanishad canon and it does not even appear in the Atharvaveda. The famous Muktikā canon, which was given by Rama to Hanuman as the list of authentic 108 Upanishads does not contain Allopanishad. Most scholars view that the book has been written during the Mughal era (possibly during Akbar's reign). Allopanishad describes Akbar as a messenger or prophet of God.

== Views on authorship and authenticity ==
In an issue of The Theosophist, R. Ananthakrishna Sastri wrote that the work was written by "Pandits to escape persecution" during the time of Muslim rule in India. He further remarked that the work was "not in the style of ordinary Upanishads" and its words "appear to sound more like Arabic". Bhattacharya and Sarkar categorize Allopanishad as an "Islamic Work" and write that it was written by a Hindu courtier of Akbar, as an "apocryphal chapter of the Atharvaveda". Charles Eliot suggested that the work may have been written in connection with the Din-i-Ilahi movement, and wrote that the work "can hardly be described as other than a forgery". Swami Vivekananda wrote that Allopanishad was evidently of a much later date and that he was told that it was written in the reign of Akbar to bring Hindus and Muslims together. Sadasivan writes that it was written by Brahmins for Akbar when he was experimenting with a new religion. Debendranath Tagore wrote in his autobiography that Allopanishad was composed in the days of Akbar with the objective of converting Hindus into Muslims. Bankim Chandra Chattopadhyay wrote that the Allopanishad was "the shameless production of some sycophant of Muslim rulers of India." Abraham Eraly states that the book was symbolic of the various cross-cultural pollination between Hindu and Muslim cultures during the time of the Mughals and was meant to bring the two communities together. According to Nityanand Mishra, an author, a scholar of Sanskrit and Hinduism, and an alumnus of IIM Bangalore—the "Allopanishad" contains explicitly Islamic terms such as Allah, Rasul (Messenger), Muhammad, Akbar, La ilaha illallah, and Allahu Akbar; and any text containing such terms cannot be considered a scripture of Hinduism or Sanatan Dharma. He also refutes the claim made by Shankaracharya Swami Nischalananda Saraswati, who had asserted that the Allopanishad is authentic or that it does not contradict the Vedas. The Shankaracharya states "Therefore, even if some Upanishads were written later by individuals, there is no objection. The principle is what matters, not just origin." The Acharya had stated that "Allah" is a Sanskrit word meaning "power" or "Bhagavati" (the Goddess), and that this term is also found in the Amarakosha (a Sanskrit lexicon). However, according to Mishra, the word "Allah" does not appear in the Amarakosha. Its meaning (in dramatic or theatrical contexts) is "mother," not "power" or "Bhagavati." Mishra further points out that the Allopanishad contains numerous absurd grammatical errors from the perspective of Sanskrit grammar (such as the incorrect mixing of gender, case, and verb forms). He argues that phrases such as "Ilzam Khabar... In Lalit Illallah" and "Adalla Buk Makkam" are not Sanskrit at all—they are either Arabic or merely nonsensical gibberish. This text forcibly conflates the Islamic Shahada and Takbir with Vedic deities such as Varuna, Mitra, and Indra. The author suspects that this text was composed during the Mughal era by a sycophant in Akbar's court, likely with the intention of promoting Akbar's syncretic religion, Din-e-Ilahi. The phrase "Rasul Muhammad Akbar" (Muhammad Akbar as a Messenger) refers not to the Islamic Prophet, but rather to Emperor Akbar (Jalaluddin Muhammad Akbar). He states that no scholar, whether Indian or Western has accepted the Allopanishad as an authentic Upanishad. He specifically cites Swami Vivekananda and Bankim Chandra Chattopadhyay (the author of Vande Mataram), both of whom had outright rejected this text.

== Use in Interfaith Polemics ==
The Allopanishad is occasionally cited by Islamic apologists, most notably Zakir Naik, to argue that: The name Allah appears in Hindu scriptures. Islam is the logical continuation or fulfillment of Hinduism. Hindu scholars counter that the text is a known forgery and does not represent any authentic Hindu tradition. The debate remains active in online and interfaith discourse.

== Views of Scholars and Religious Figures ==
R. Ananthakrishna Sastri: Wrote that the work was written by "Pandits to escape persecution" during Muslim rule; noted it is "not in the style of ordinary Upanishads" and its words "appear to sound more like Arabic."

Jogendranath Sarkar & B.K. Sarkar: Categorize Allopanishad as an "Islamic Work" written by a Hindu courtier of Akbar as an "apocryphal chapter of the Atharvaveda."

Charles Eliot: In his work Hinduism and Buddhism, An Historical Sketch (Vol. 2) Suggested it was written in connection with Din-i-Ilahi; called it a "forgery."

Swami Vivekananda: Wrote that Allopanishad was "evidently of a much later date" and that he was told it was written in Akbar's reign "to bring Hindus and Muslims together."

Debendranath Tagore: Wrote in his autobiography that it was composed in Akbar's days with the "objective of converting Hindus into Muslims."

Bankim Chandra Chattopadhyay: Called it "the shameless production of some sycophant of Muslim rulers of India."

Swami Dayananda Saraswati: In Satyarth Prakash, argued that the Allopanishad is not part of the Upanishad canon and does not appear in the Atharvaveda.

Alternative View One alternative perspective, noted in some sources, suggests that the word "Allah" in Sanskrit contexts may be understood as a reference to Shakti or the female aspect of the divine, and that the text could be interpreted as a Tantric scripture for Devi worship. However, this view is not widely accepted by mainstream scholar

== See also ==
- Din-i-Ilahi
- Upanishads
