= Sarmad Kashani =

Persian-speaking Armenian mystic and poet (c. 1590–1661)

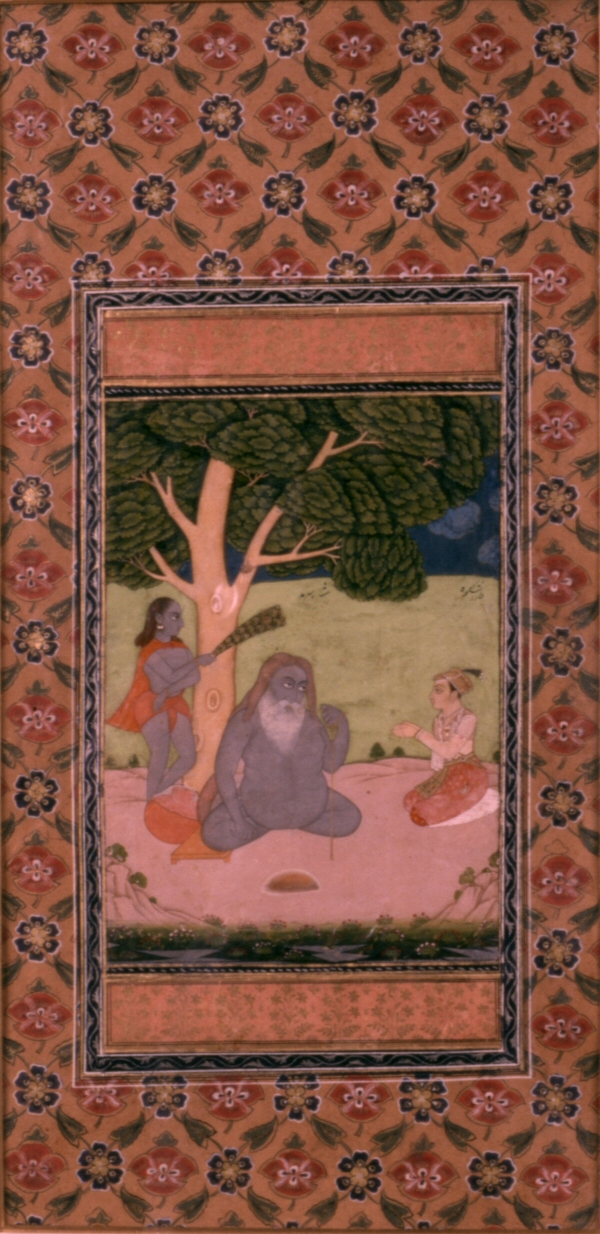
- Shah Sarmad (centre) seated with Dara Shikoh (right) – a single leaf from a manuscript

Personal life
- Born: c. 1590 Armenia, Safavid Armenia
- Died: 1661 Delhi, Delhi Subah, Mughal Empire
- Cause of death: Execution by beheading
- Main interests: Mysticism; Atheism; syncretism; poetry; Sufi metaphysics

Religious life
- Religion: Unknown

Senior posting
- Influenced by: Mulla Sadra, Mir Findiriski
- Influenced: Dara Shikoh, Abul Kalam Azad

Sarmad Kashani (c. 1590–1661) was a Persian-speaking Armenian mystic and poet who travelled to and made the Indian subcontinent his permanent home during the 17th century. Originally Jewish, he may have renounced his religion to adopt Islam. However his conversion was probably only nominal and superficial, since he himself used to warn the Jews not to convert themselves. Sarmad, in his poetry, stated that he is neither Jewish, nor Muslim, nor Hindu.

== Early life ==
Sarmad was born in Armenia or Kashan around 1590, to a family of Jewish Persian-speaking Armenian merchants. (Note: The Jewish Encyclopedia suggests that Kashani was born in Kashan, Iran to a rabbinical family.) Sarmad had an excellent command of Persian, essential for his work as a merchant, and composed most of his works in this language. He produced a translation of the Torah in Persian. He studied under Mulla Sadra and Mir Findiriski before migrating to the Mughal Empire as a merchant.

== Travels in the Mughal Empire ==
Hearing that precious items and works of art were being purchased in India at high prices, Sarmad gathered together his wares and traveled to the Mughal Empire where he intended to sell them. In Thatta, in present day Sindh, Pakistan, one of his close disciples was a Hindu called Abhay Chand. Although there is debate on the nature of their relationship very little is known about the life of Abhay Chand and no historical records to confirm the details of their encounter, except Sarmad's own poetry. Some scholars have argued that, while Sarmad employed Abhay Chand to translate the Torah as well as Old Testament and New Testament, it is possible that Abhay Chand converted to Islam or Judaism. In later years, Sarmad grew critical of all religions and took a more "spiritual but not religious" position.

At some stage, he abandoned his wealth, let his hair grow, stopped clipping his nails and began to wander the city streets. Although it is widely speculated that Sarmad and Abhay Chand moved to Lahore, then to Hyderabad, settling finally in Delhi, however there are no credible sources to confirm the events.

== Life in Delhi ==
The reputation as a poet and mystic he had acquired during the time the two travelled together, caused the Mughal crown prince Dara Shikoh to invite Sarmad at his father's court. On this occasion, Sarmad so deeply impressed the imperial heir that he vowed to become his disciple.

Sarmad has been witnessed by the French physician and traveler, François Bernier, who reported Sarmad as a naked faqir.

== Death ==
After the War of Succession with his brother Dara Shikoh, Aurangzeb (1658–1707) emerged victorious, killed his former adversary and ascended the imperial throne. He had Sarmad arrested. Sarmad was put to death by beheading in 1661 due to his support for Dara Shikoh. His grave is located near the Jama Masjid in Delhi, India.

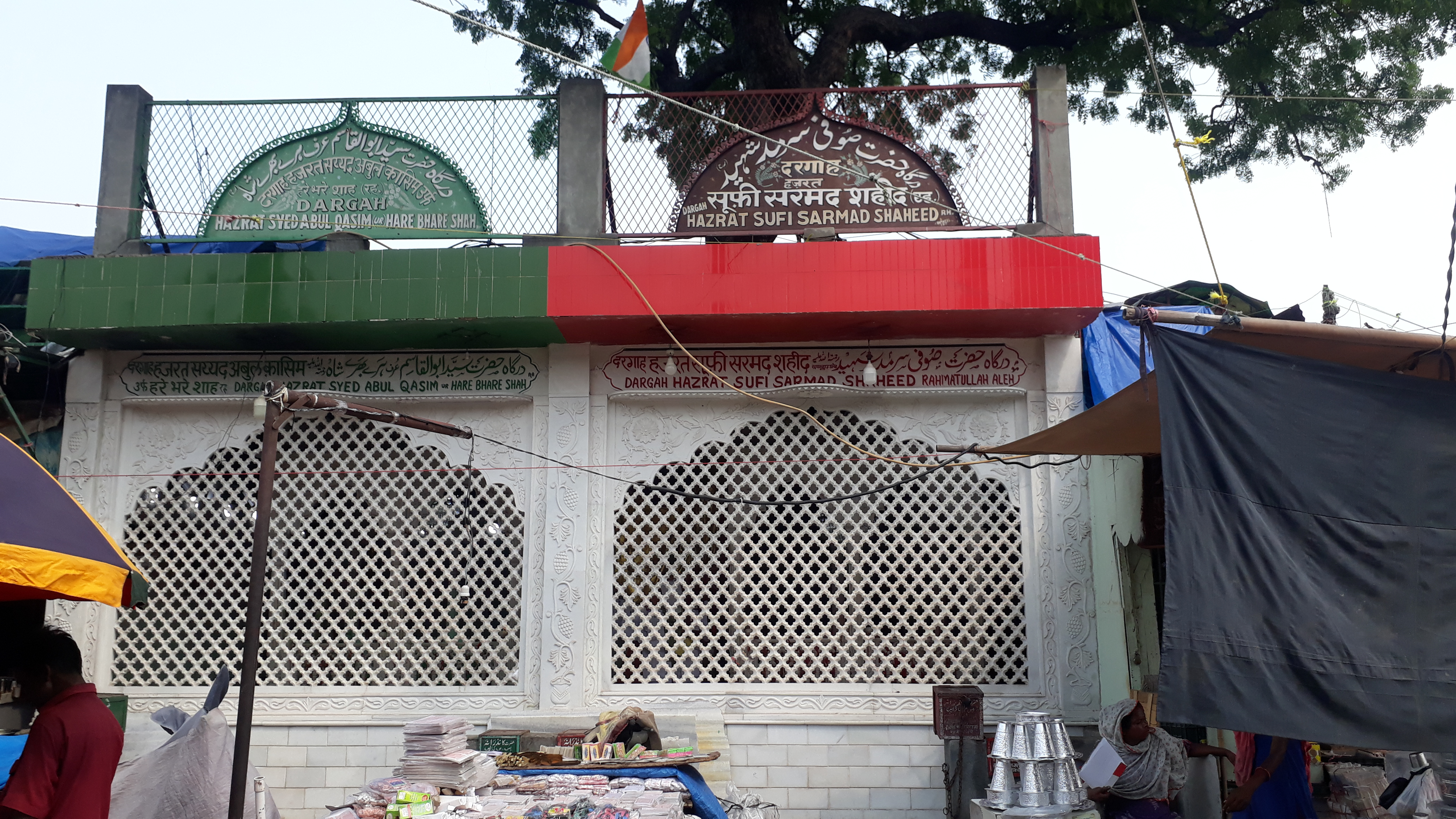
The grave of Sarmad Kashani in Old Delhi

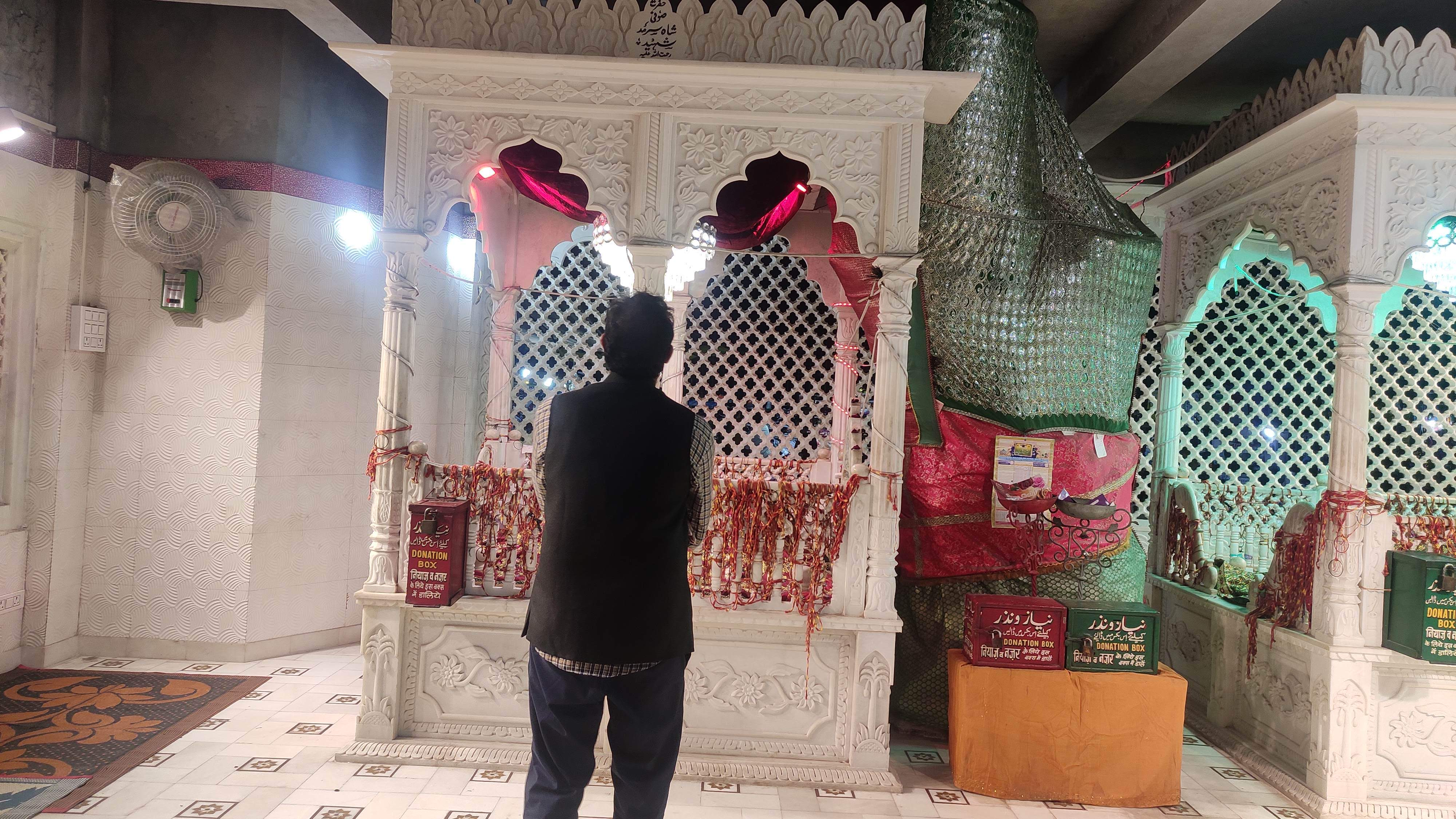
A devotee inside the tomb of Sarmad

Ali Khan-Razi, Aurangzeb's court chronicler, was present at the execution. He relates some of the mystic's verses uttered at the execution stand: "The Mullahs say Ahmed went to heaven, Sarmad says that heaven came down to Ahmed."... "There was an uproar and we opened our eyes from the eternal sleep. Saw that the night of wickedness endured, so we slept again."

== Legacy ==
Abul Kalam Azad, one of the leading political personalities involved in the Indian independence movement, compared himself to Sarmad, for his freedom of thought and expression. The book of the romances of an outlaw, including the rereading of the life, poetry and thoughts of Saeed Sarmad Kashani, edited by Abdolhamid Ziaei, was published in 2009.

== In popular culture ==
In 2022, the International Short Film Festival Oberhausen premiered a cinematic piece by Iranian artist Lior Shamriz, which is partly based on the life of Sarmad, and is titled "Port Saïd, Santa Cruz, Sarmad Kashani". The National Museum of Modern and Contemporary Art in Korea and the National Gallery of Victoria in Australia presented the work later in the year.

== See also ==
- Dabestan-e Mazaheb

== Bibliography ==
- Rubā‘iyyāt-i Sarmad, ed. Fazl Mahmud Asiri, with a preface by S. Qazvini, Prabhat Kumar Mukherjee Shantiniketan (Visva Bharati Series 11), Shantiniketan 1950.
- Abul Kalam Azad, Sarmad Shahid IN: S. S. Hameed, The Rubayat of Sarmad, New Delhi 1991, pp. 18–41.
- Cook, D. (2007) Martyrdom in Islam (Cambridge) ISBN 9780521850407.
- Tr. by Syeda Sayidain Hameed (1991). "The Rubaiyat of Sarmad" (PDF). Indian Council for Cultural Relations.
- Ezekial, I.A. (1966) Sarmad: Jewish Saint of India (Beas) ASIN B0006EXYM6.
- Gupta, M.G. (2000) Sarmad the Saint: Life and Works (Agra) ISBN 81-85532-32-X.
- Katz, N. (2000) The Identity of a Mystic: The Case of Sa'id Sarmad, a Jewish-Yogi-Sufi Courtier of the Mughals in: Numen 47: 142–160.
- Rai, L. (1978) Sarmad. His Life and Rubais, Hanumanprasad Poddar Smarak Samita, Gorakhpur.
- Schimmel, A. And Muhammad Is His Messenger: The Veneration Of the Prophet In Islamic Piety (Chapel Hill & London).
- Sarmad di Kashan. Dio ama la bellezza del mio peccato. Le quartine di un poeta mistico della tradizione indo-persiana, ed. Carlo Saccone, Centro Essad Bey-Amazon IP, Seattle 2022
- Sarmad er Rubai, Edited, Compiled and Translated in Bengali by Abdul Kafi with an Afterword (posthumously) by Rejaul Karim, Ekalavya Publishing, 2022.

== External resources ==
- Sarmad, Mohammed Sa'id
- Majid Sheikh, Sarmad the Armenian and Dara Shikoh
- Sarmad, a mystic poet beheaded in 1661
