= Mian Mir =

Sufi Muslim saint (1550–1635)

Mian Mir; میاں میر
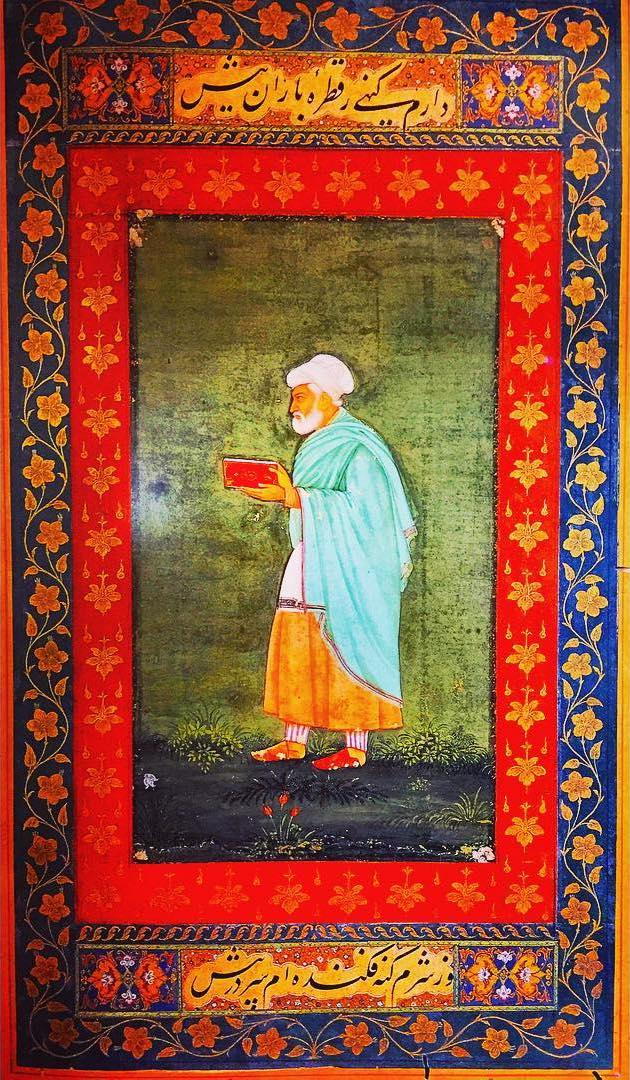
- Painting of the Sufi saint Mian Mir, commissioned by Dara Shikoh, ca.1635
- Born: Mir Mohammed Muayyinul Islam; 1550; Thatta, Arghun Kingdom (modern-day Sindh, Pakistan)
- Died: 22 August 1635 (aged 84–85); Lahore, lahore Subah, Mughal Empire (modern-day Punjab, Pakistan)
- Venerated in: Both in Qadiri order of Sufism and Sikhism
- Major shrine: Shrine of Mian Mir, Lahore

Mian Mir Muhammad Qadiri (Punjabi: میاں میر محمد قادری, c. 1550 – 22 August 1635), better known as Mian Mir or Miyan Mir, was a Sufi Muslim saint who resided in Lahore, in the neighborhood now known as Dharampura which is populated by many poor people to whom it provides free shelter and free food.

He was a direct descendant of Caliph Umar ibn al-Khattab and belonged to the Qadiri order of Sufism. He is famous for being a spiritual instructor of Dara Shikoh, the eldest son of Mughal emperor Shah Jahan. He is identified as the founder of the Mian Khel branch of the Qadiri order. His younger sister Bibi Jamal Khatun was a disciple of his and a notable Sufi saint in her own right.

== Mian Mir and Emperor Jahangir ==
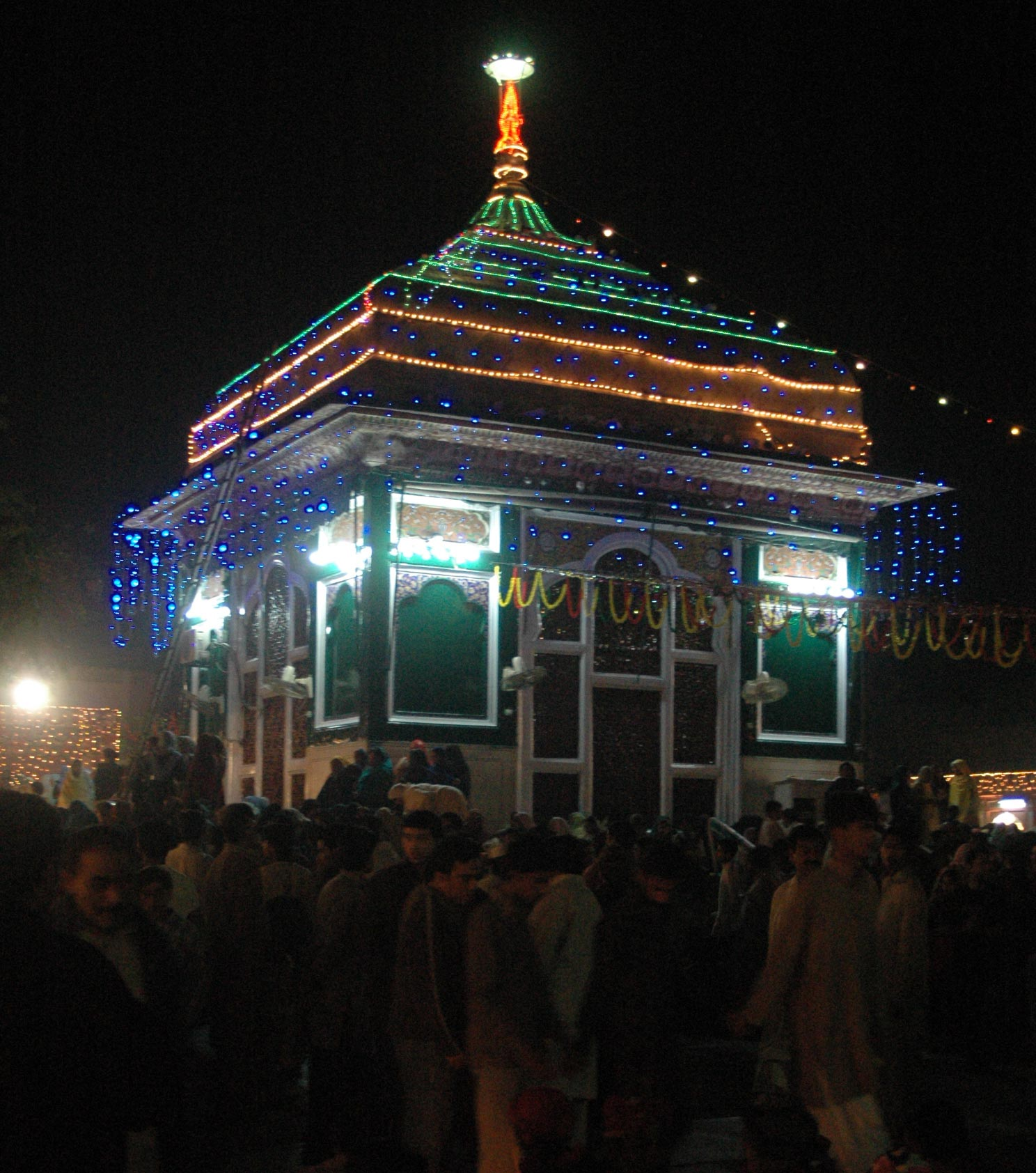
Shrine of Mian Mir.

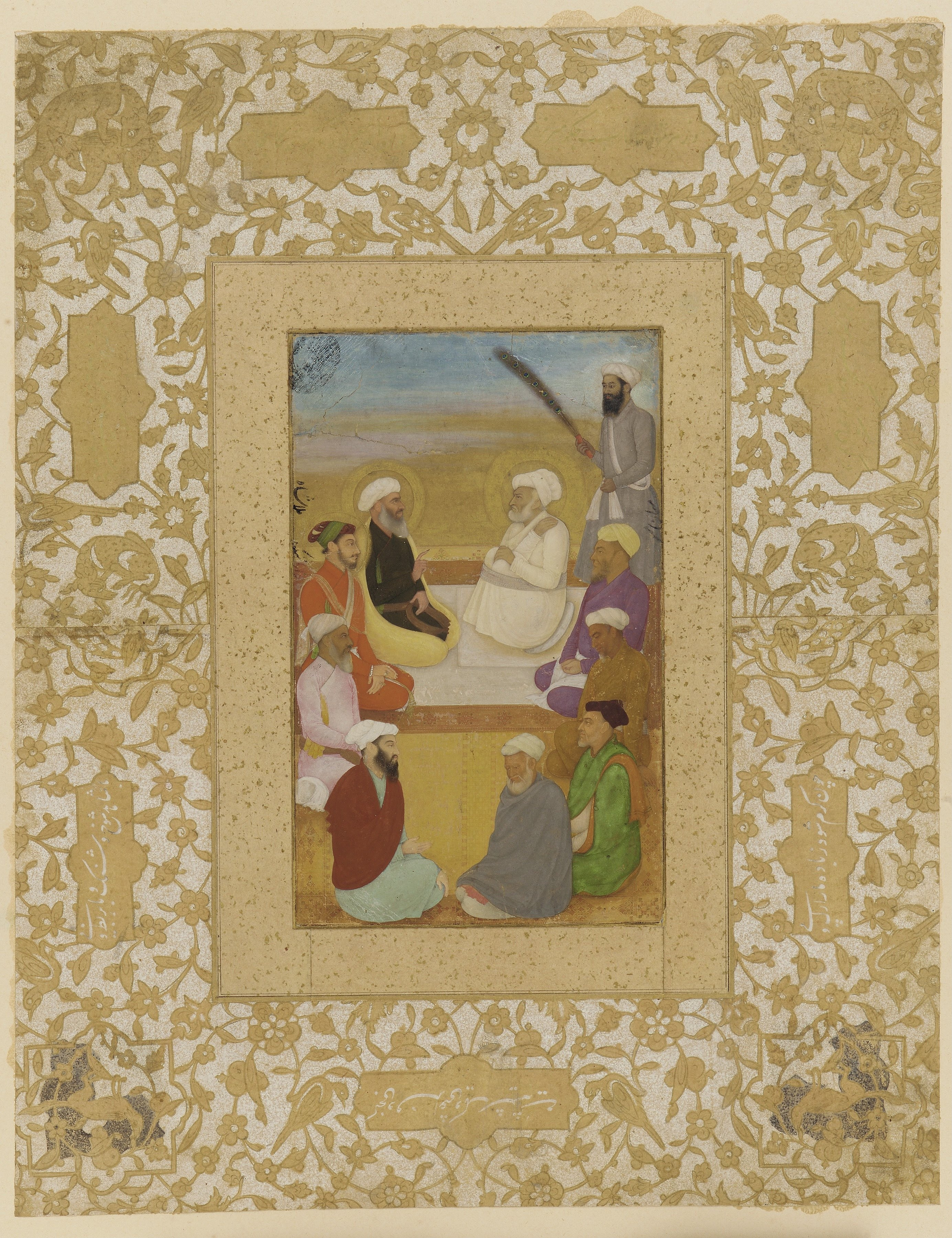
Dara Shikoh with Mian Mir and Mullah Shah Badakhshi

Mian Mir migrated from Sindh region, where he was born, to and settled in Lahore at the age of 25. He was a friend of God-loving people and he would shun worldly, selfish men, greedy Emirs and ambitious Nawabs who ran after faqirs to get their blessings. To stop such people from coming to see him, Mian Mir posted his mureeds (disciples) at the gate of his house.

Once, Jahangir, the Mughal emperor, with all his retinue came to pay homage to the great faqir. He came with all the pomp and show that befitted an emperor. Mian Mir's sentinels however, stopped the emperor at the gate and requested him to wait until their master had given permission to enter. Jahangir felt slighted. No one had ever dared delay or question his entry to any place in his kingdom. Yet he controlled his temper and composed himself. He waited for permission. After a while, he was ushered into Mian Mir's presence. Unable to hide his wounded vanity, Jahangir, as soon as he entered, told Mian Mir in Persian: Ba dar-e-darvis darbane naa-bayd ("On the doorstep of a faqir, there should be no sentry"). The reply from Mian Mir was, "Babayd keh sage dunia na ayad" (So that selfish men may not enter).

The emperor was embarrassed and asked for forgiveness. Then, with folded hands, Jahangir requested Mian Mir to pray for the success of the campaign which he intended to launch for the conquest of the Deccan. Meanwhile, a poor man entered and, bowing his head to Mian Mir, made an offering of a rupee before him. The Sufi asked the devotee to pick up the rupee and give it to the poorest, neediest person in the audience. The devotee went from one dervish to another but none accepted the rupee. The devotee returned to Mian Mir with the rupee saying: "Master, none of the dervishes will accept the rupee. None is in need, it seems."

"Go and give this rupee to him," said the faqir, pointing to Jahangir. "He is the poorest and most needy of the lot. Not content with a big kingdom, he covets the kingdom of the Deccan. For that, he has come all the way from Delhi to beg. His hunger is like a fire that burns all the more furiously with more wood. It has made him needy, greedy and grim. Go and give the rupee to him."

== Mian Mir and Sikhism ==
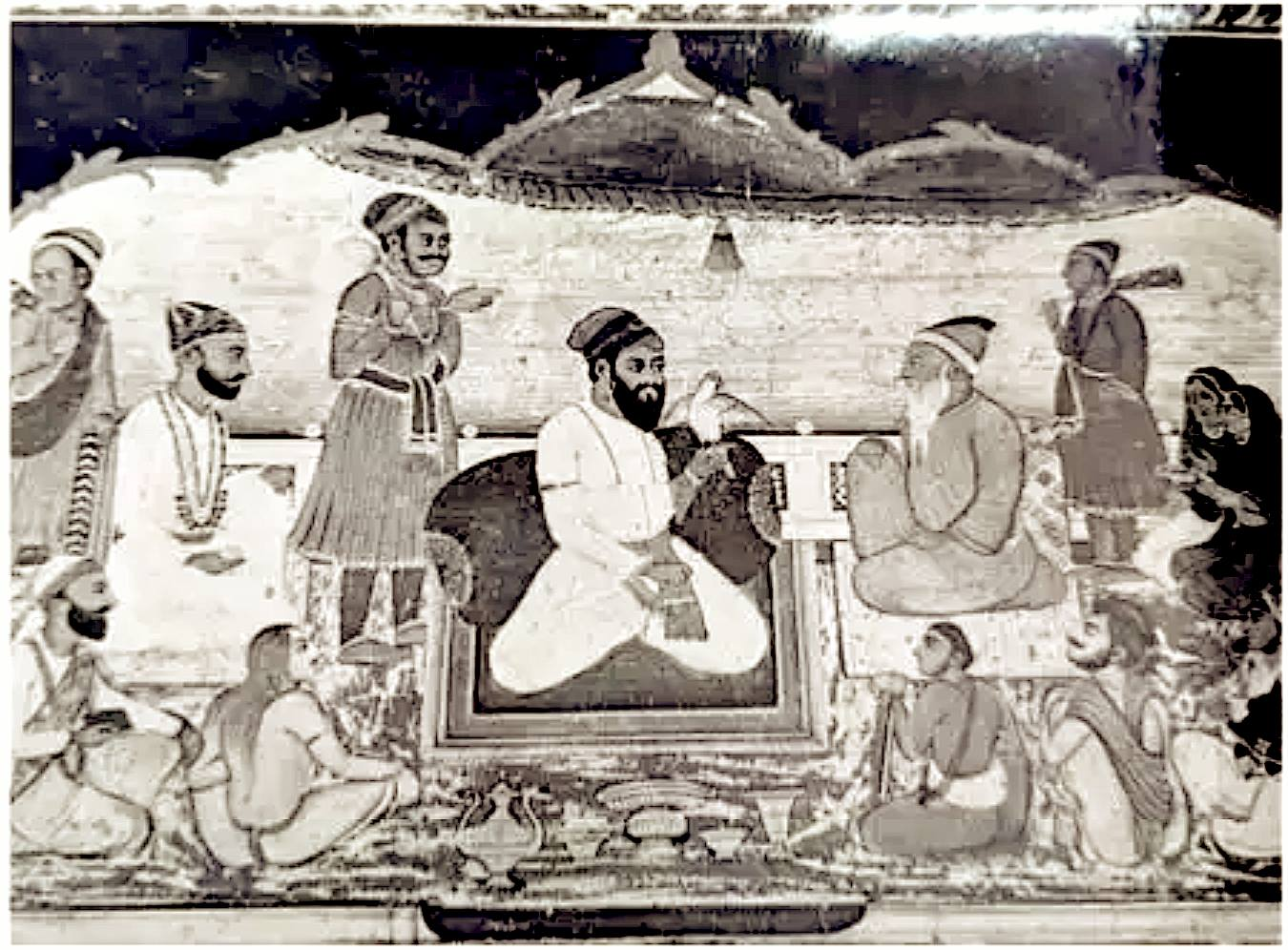
Fresco depicting Guru Hargobind meeting Mian Mir. The fresco is from Akhara Prag Das, Amritsar.

According to Sikh tradition, the Sikh guru, Guru Arjan Dev, met Mian Mir during his stay in Lahore. This tradition does not appear in the early Sikh literature, and is first mentioned in the 18th and 19th century chronicles.

=== Legend about foundation of Harmandir Sahib ===
According to the Tawarikh-i-Punjab (1848), written by Ghulam Muhayy-ud-Din Bute Shah, Mian Mir laid the foundation of the Sikh shrine Harmandir Sahib (Golden Temple), at the request of Guru Arjan Dev. This is also mentioned in several European sources, beginning with The Punjab Notes and Queries. Even the Report Sri Darbar Sahib (1929), published by the Harmandir Sahib temple authorities, have endorsed this account.

However, this legend is not reported in other historic texts.

== Death and legacy ==
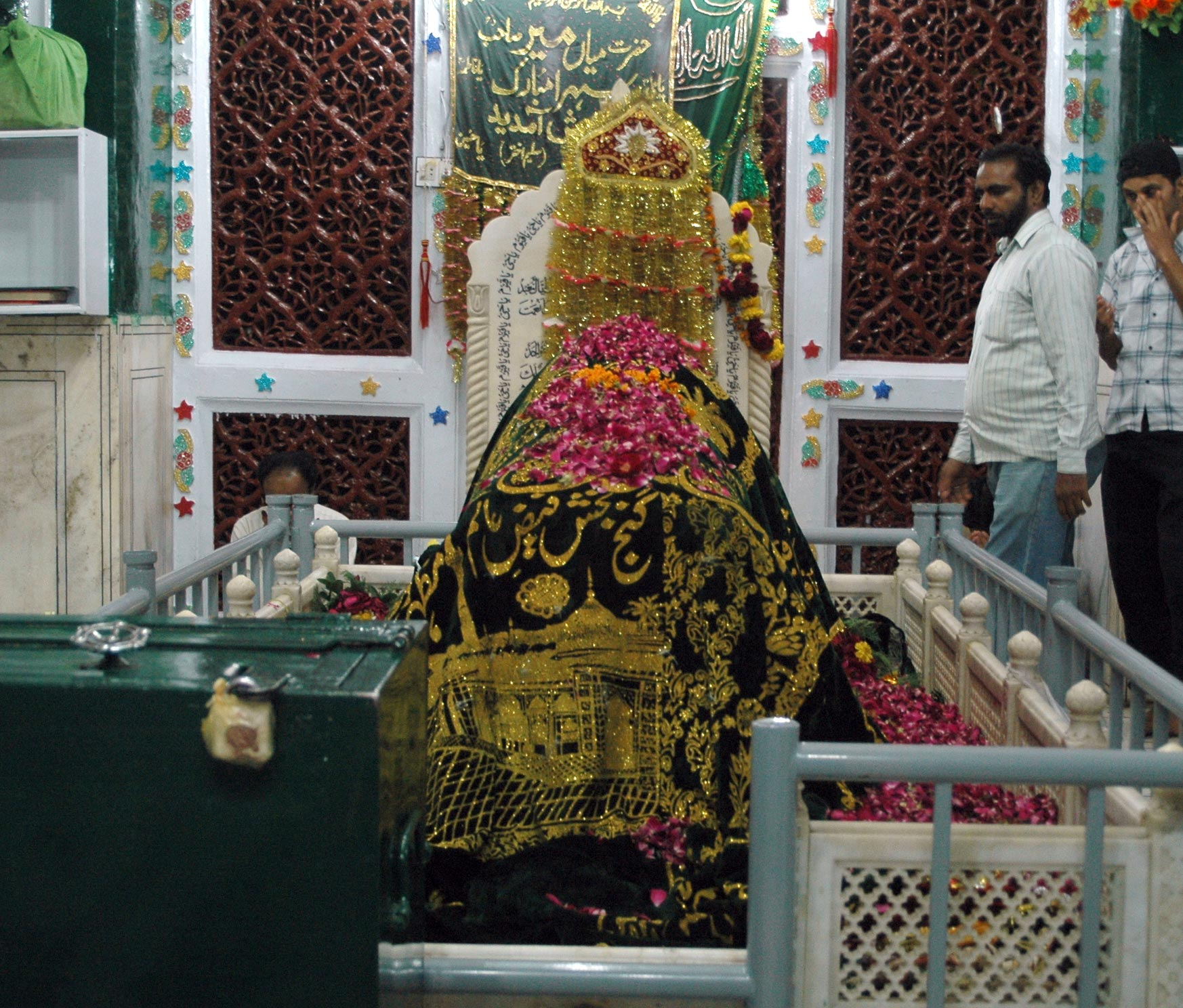
Inside view of Mian Mir's Mausoleum in Lahore.

After having lived a long life of piety and virtuosity, Mian Mir died on 11 August 1635 at age 84 to 85.

His funeral oration was read by Mughal prince Dara Shikoh, who was a highly devoted disciple of the Saint. There is a hospital named after him in his hometown Lahore, called Mian Mir Hospital.

A major Pakistani English-language newspaper says about his legacy:

"Mian Mir was an icon of unity, tolerance and love during and after the Mughal era".

=== Tomb ===
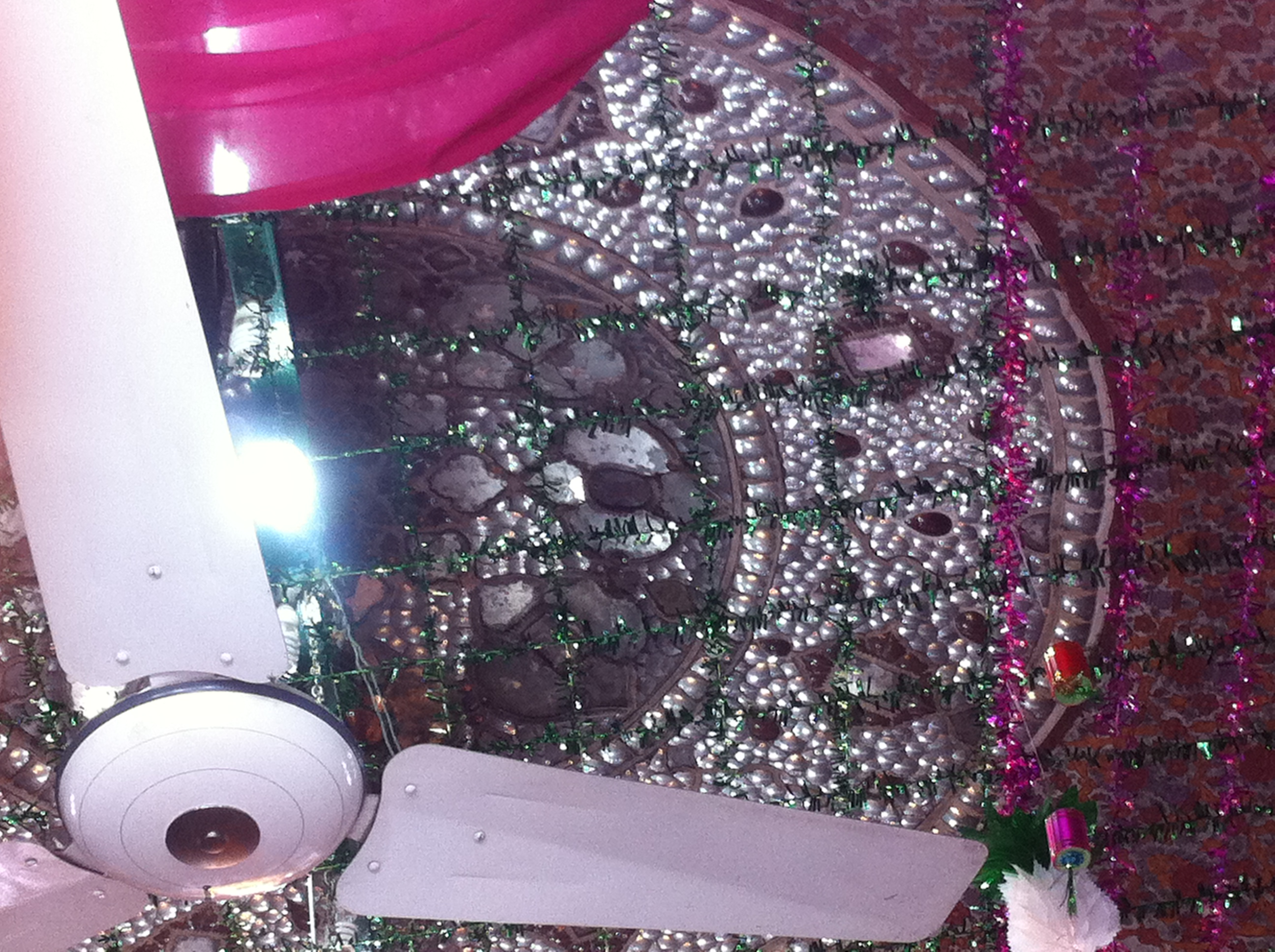
The heavily embellished ceiling of Mian Mir tomb

He was buried at a place which was about a mile from Lahore near Alamganj, that is at the south-east of the city. Mian Mir's spiritual successor was Mullah Shah Badakhshi. Mian Mir's Mazar (Mausoleum) still attracts hundreds of devotees each day and he is revered by many Sikhs as well as Muslims. Street vendors sell food items like dahi baray, chaat, sharbat and samosas to the visitors to the shrine on the outskirts of it.The tomb's architecture still remains quite intact to this day. His death anniversary ('Urs' in Urdu language) is observed there by his devotees every year.
