= Sunehra Makan Mahal =

Palace in Fatehpur Sikri, India

Coordinates: 27°05′49″N 77°39′56″E

Sunehra Makan Mahal (The Golden Palace) is a palace located in the harem quarters of the Fatehpur Sikri fort. The palace was named as such because of its rich frescoes and gilded walls.

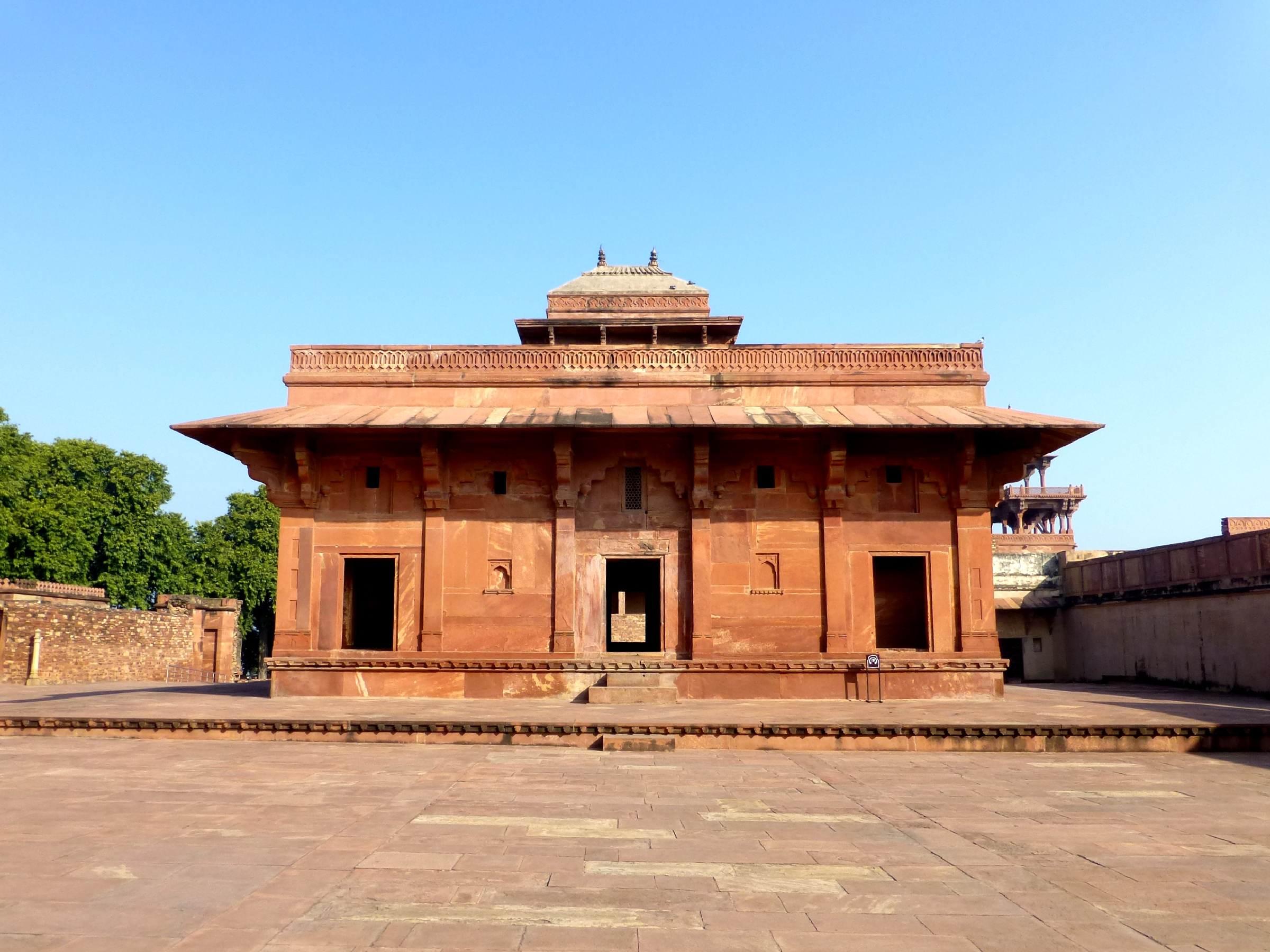
Front view of the Sunehra Makan palace.

== History ==
The palace was the residence of Hamida Banu Begum, who was the mother of Emperor Akbar. She bore the titles of Mariam Makani and was the Padshah Begum during his reign. Akbar had shifted the capital of the Mughal Empire from Agra to Fatehpur Sikri in 1571, with construction of the fort beginning in 1569 in honor and graditude of the Chishti Sheikh Salim who had predicted the birth of Prince Salim.

== Architecture and ornamentation ==
The palace, located opposite to Empress Mariam-uz-Zamani's palace is situated on a platform, and contains five storeys with each floor smaller than the one below with a domed kiosk. A continuous chhajja pattern runs along each elevation, which are supported on curved brackets.

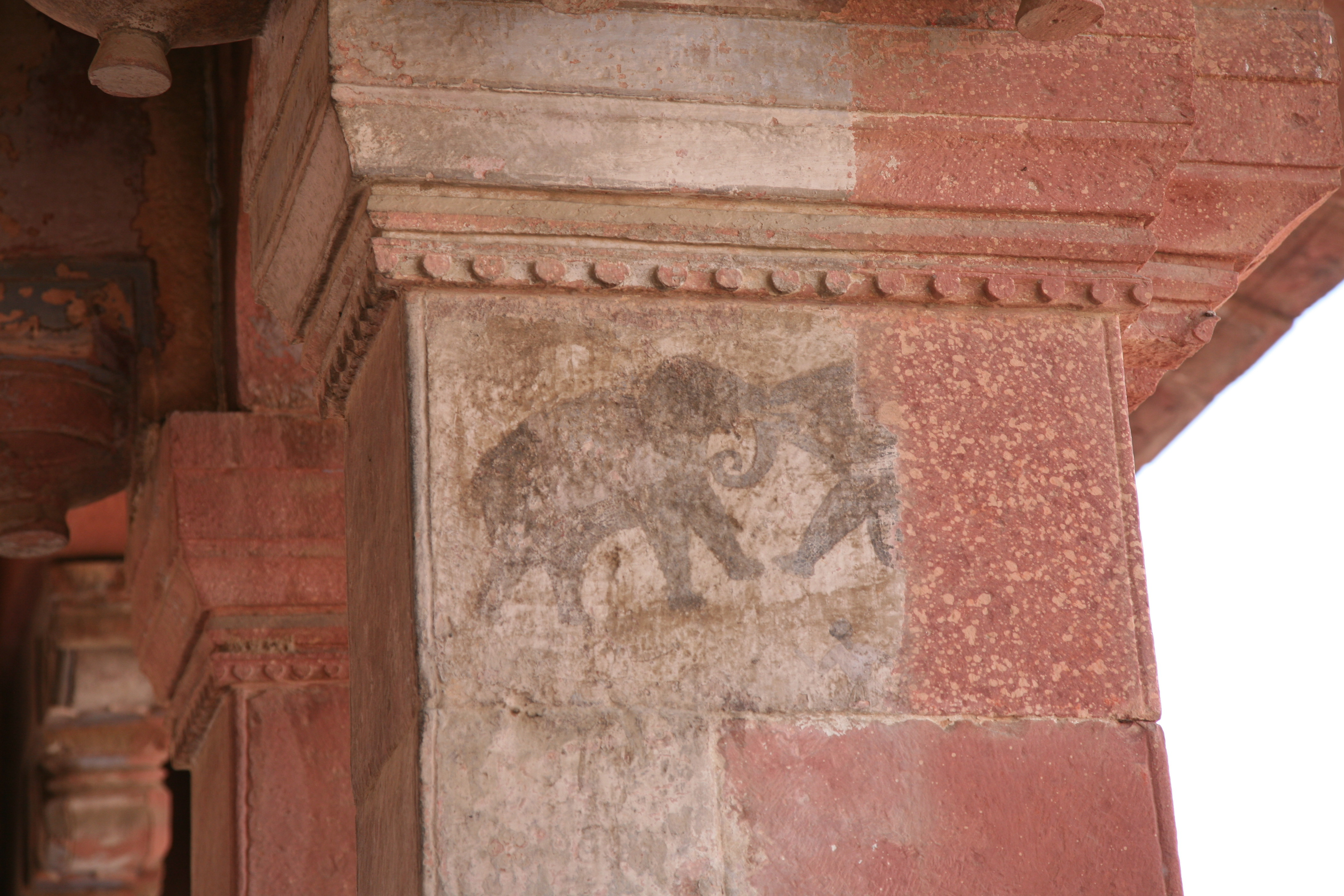
Frescoe of an elephant fight on a pillar of the palace.

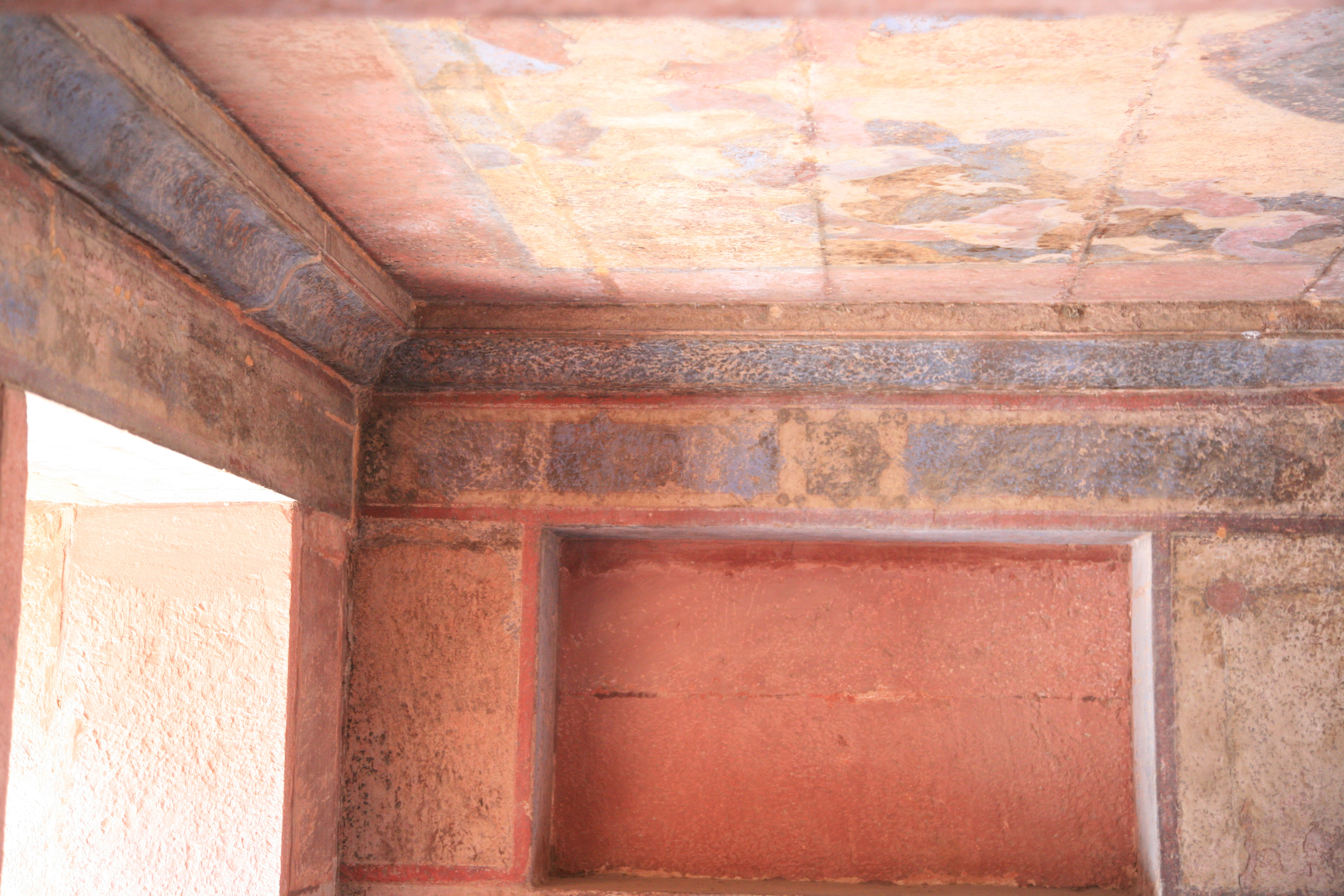
Vibrantly hued paintings on the interior walls.

The roof of the palace is flat, with a rectangular chhatri on the northern part. The interior and exterior walls are richly painted with hues of gold, deep blue, and red. The frescoes depict elephant fights, hunts, and battle scenes, and incorporate Indian flora and fauna in its design.

== Gallery ==
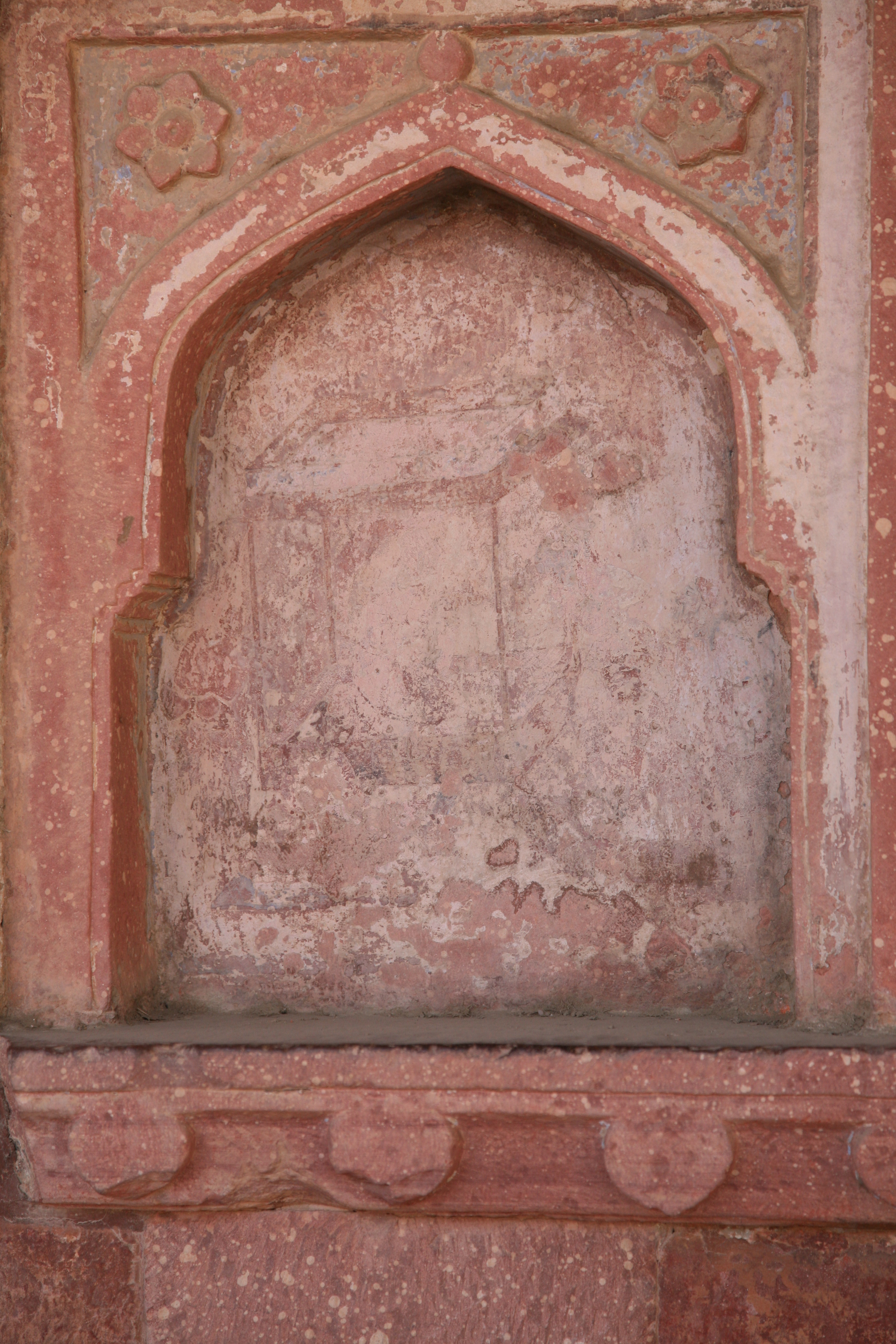
An Aala on the interior wall.

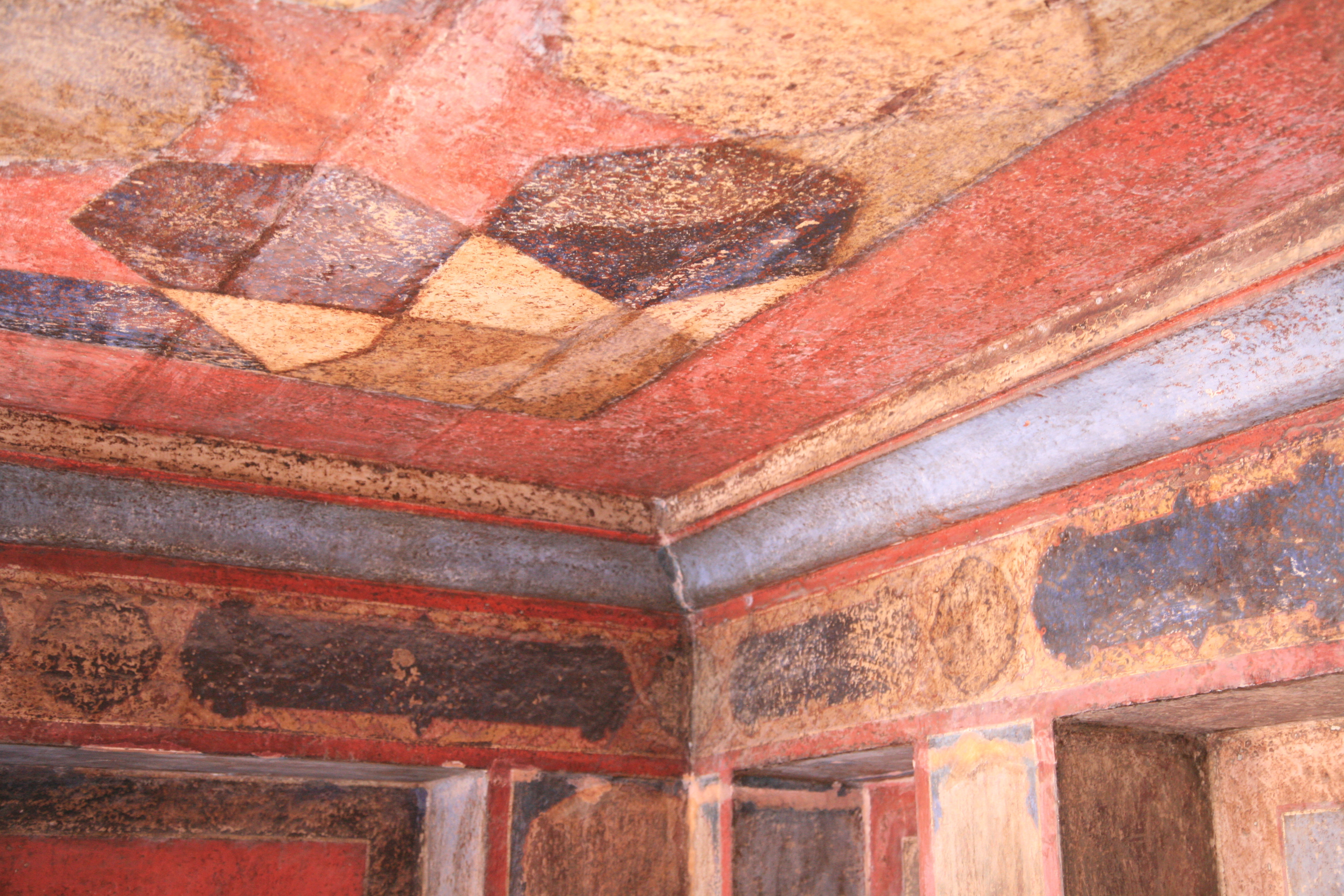
Frescoes of the ceiling.

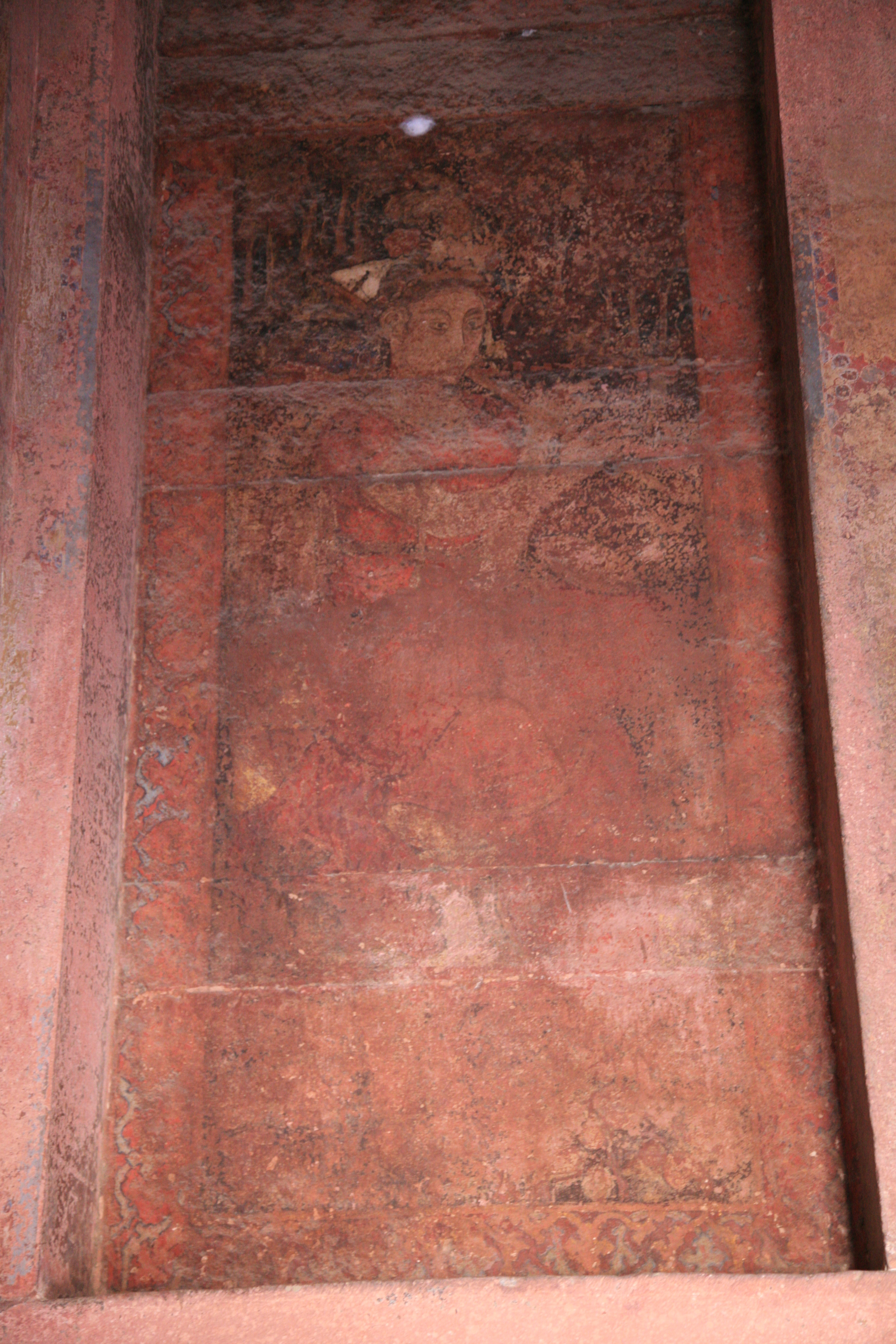
A fresco mural inside depicting a woman playing a flute.

== See also ==
- Jodha Bai Mahal
- Birbal Mahal
- Jahangiri Mahal
