= Birbal Mahal =

Residence of imperial consorts at Fatehpur Sikri

Coordinates: 27°05′49″N 77°39′52″E

Birbal Mahal (tl. Birbal's Palace) is a palace commisoned by Emperor Akbar in 1571. It is located in the harem quarters of the Fatehpur Sikri fort and was built for the ladies of the imperial harem.

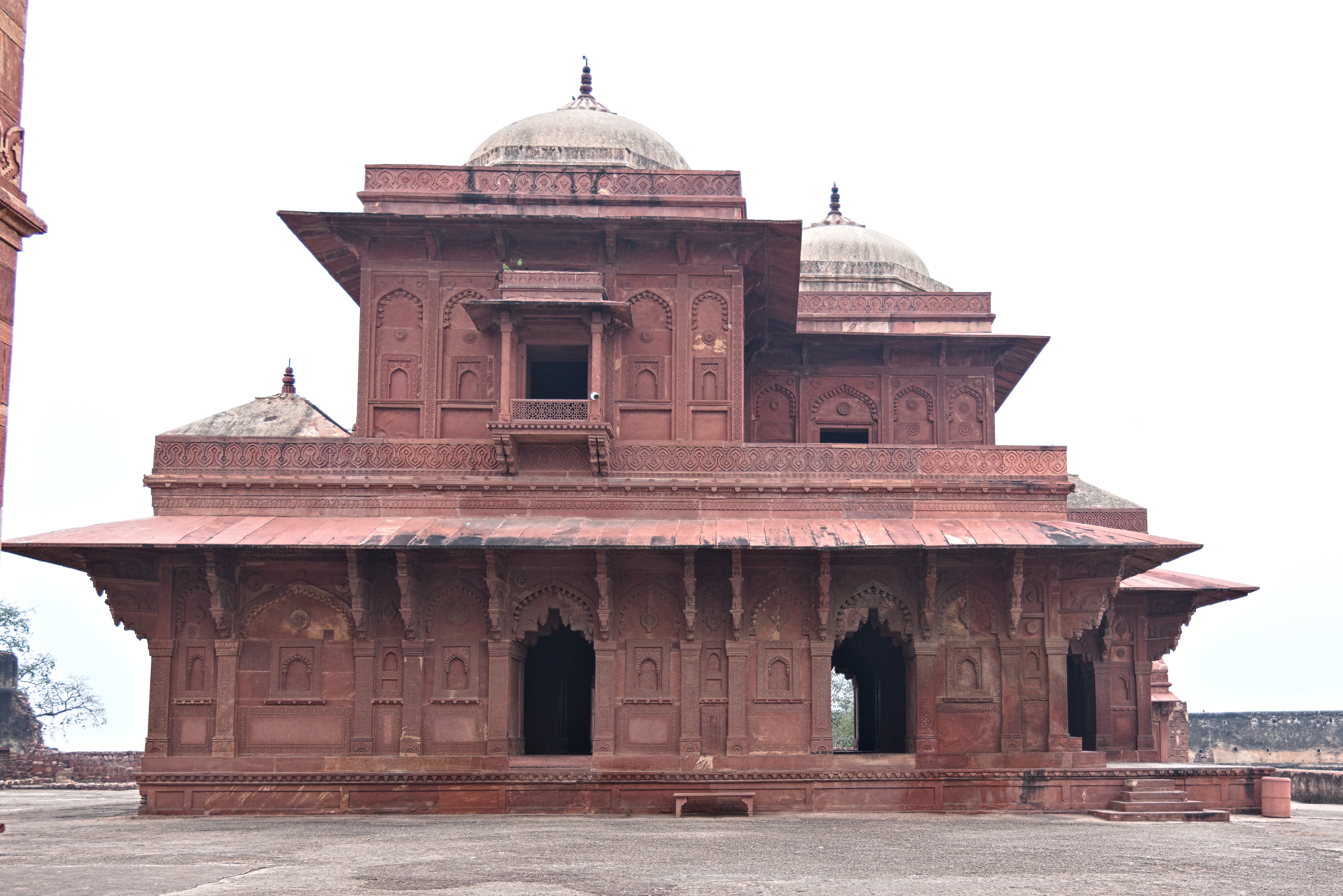
Front view of the Birbal Mahal.

== History ==
During the reign of Akbar, the palace was the residence of his two chief consorts, Ruqaiya Sultan Begum and Salima Sultan Begum.

Ruqaiya Sultan Begum was the first wife of Akbar and was married to him in 1556, becoming his chief consort. Her father, Hindal Mirza had died fighting against his half brother Kamran Mirza's forces in 20 November 1551. Out of affection for the memory of his brother, Humayun had the princess betrothed to his son Akbar.

Salima Sultan Begum was the third wife of Akbar. She was the daughter of The Viceroy of Kannauj, Nuruddin Muhammad Mirza, and Gulrukh Begum. She was initially betrothed to Akbar's regent, Bairam Khan, and was married off to him in 1557. The brief marriage lasted for only three years, as Bairam Khan was assassinated in 1561 in Patan by a group of bandits led by Mubarak Khan. The newly widowed Salima along with the remaining members of the plundered camp fled and reached Ahmedabad after much hardship. Akbar, saddened by the death, summoned Salima and her step son Abdul Rahim to the imperial Mughal court in great respect, and later married her in 7 May 1561. She became his third consort and enjoyed a high rank in the imperial harem, holding much influence over Akbar, and later his stepson Jahangir.

Akbar had shifted the capital of the Mughal Empire from Agra to Fatehpur Sikri in 1571, with the construction of the fort beginning in 1569 in honor of the Chishti Sheikh Salim who had predicted the birth of Prince Salim.

== Architecture ==
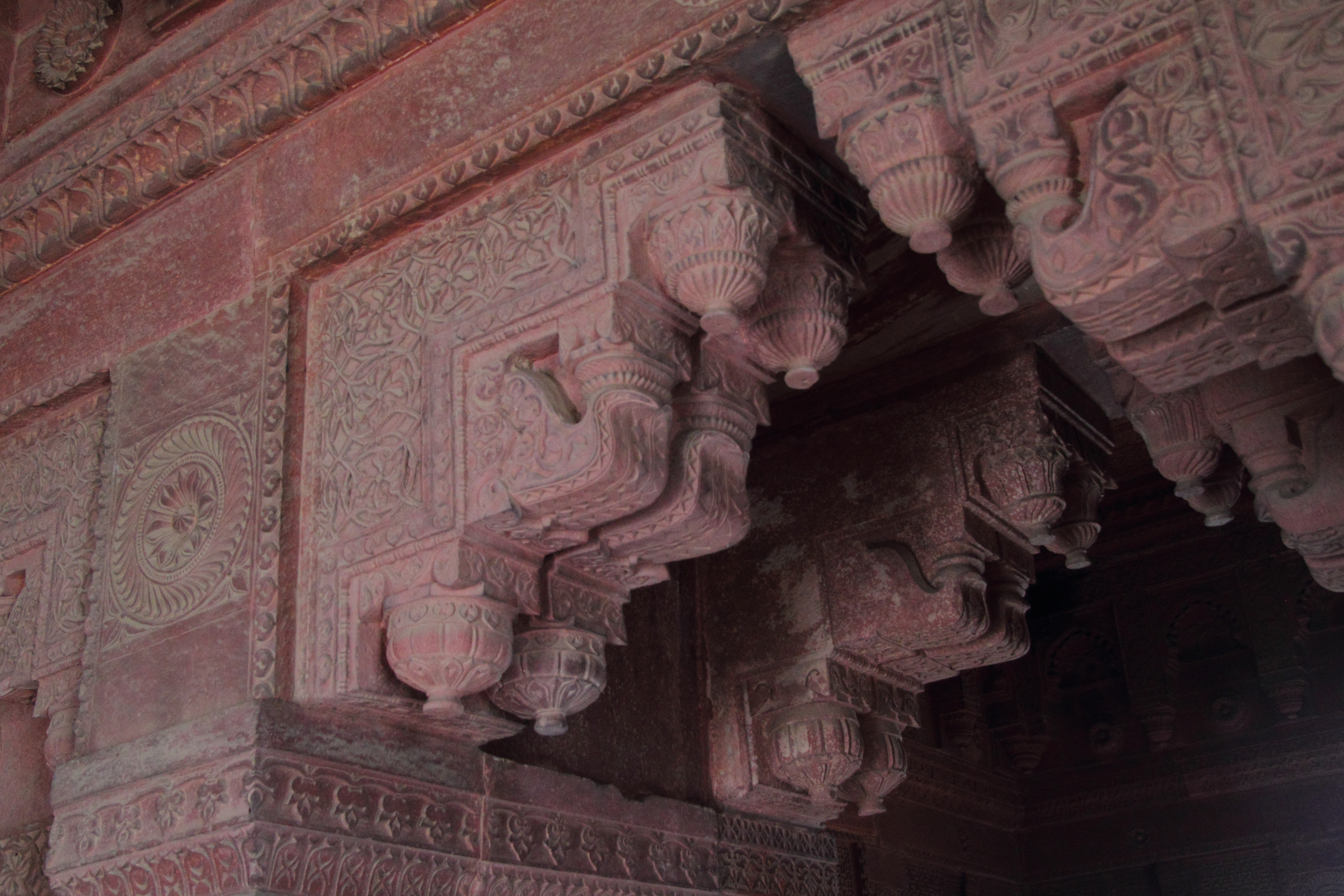
Carvings on the sandstone archways of the palace.

The palace has two storeys with four rooms, two porches with pyramiding roofs below, two rooms with cupolas and screened terraces above, and Intricate jharokhas, brackets, and eaves. The double domed structures of the roof and cupolas kept the room cool, providing air circulation throughout, along with the diagonal positioning of the upper rooms which made the terrace shady. It stands northwest to the palace of Empress Mariam-uz-Zamani.

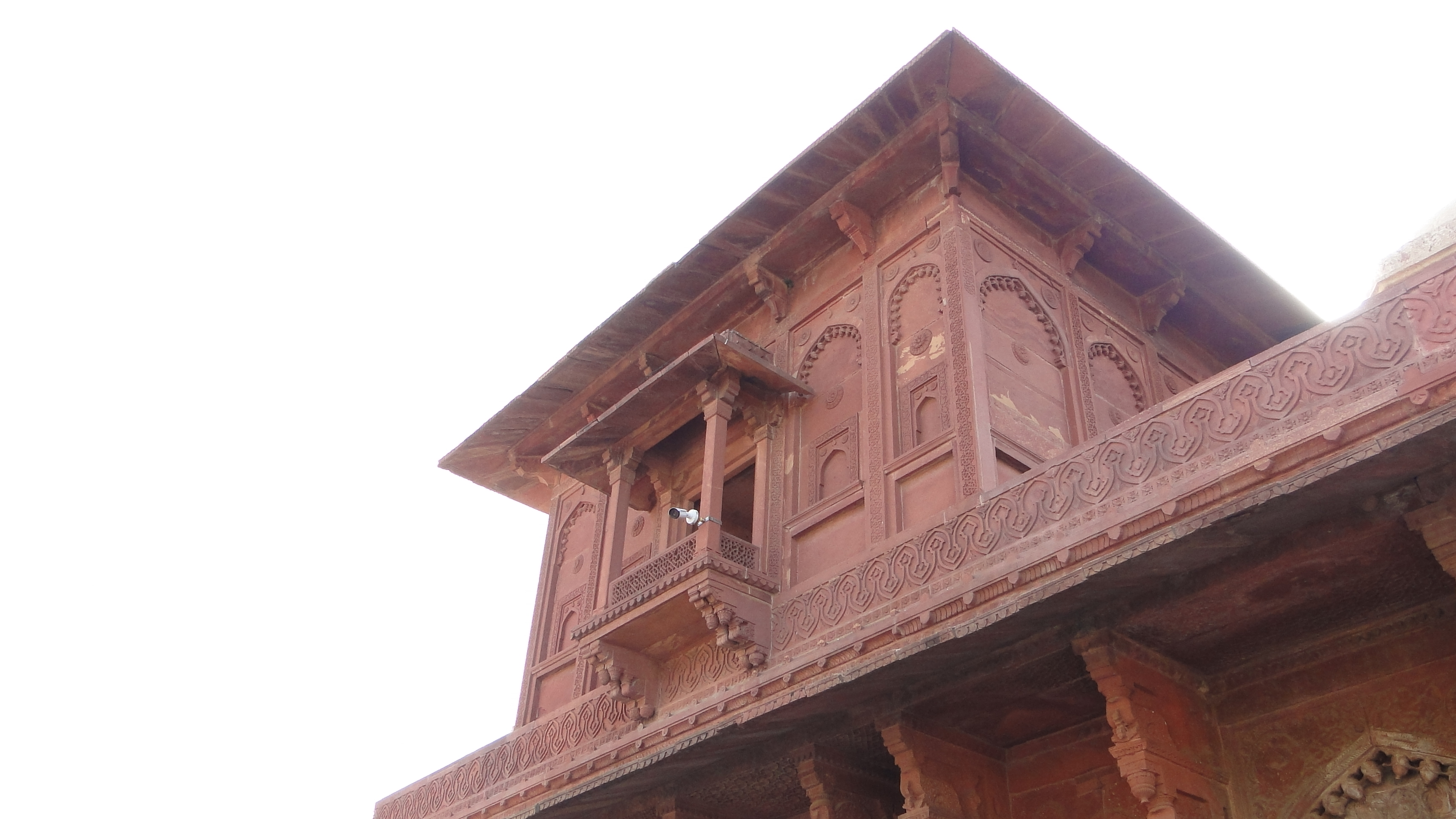
Jharokha at the upper terrace.

=== Misidentificaton as the residence of Birbal ===
The palace is known by many as being the palace of Mahesh Das, (known by his title Raja Birbal) minister and commander of the Mughal dynasty and one of the members of Akbar's group of courtiers called the "navaratnas" (lit. Nine Gems). However, this is a misnomer as it is located in the imperial harem quarters, which, with the exception of princes who had not attained puberty, was restricted to men other than the Emperor. Thus, Birbal wouldn't be allowed there.

== See also ==
- Jodha Bai Mahal
- Jahangiri Mahal
- Sunehra Makan Mahal

== Gallery ==
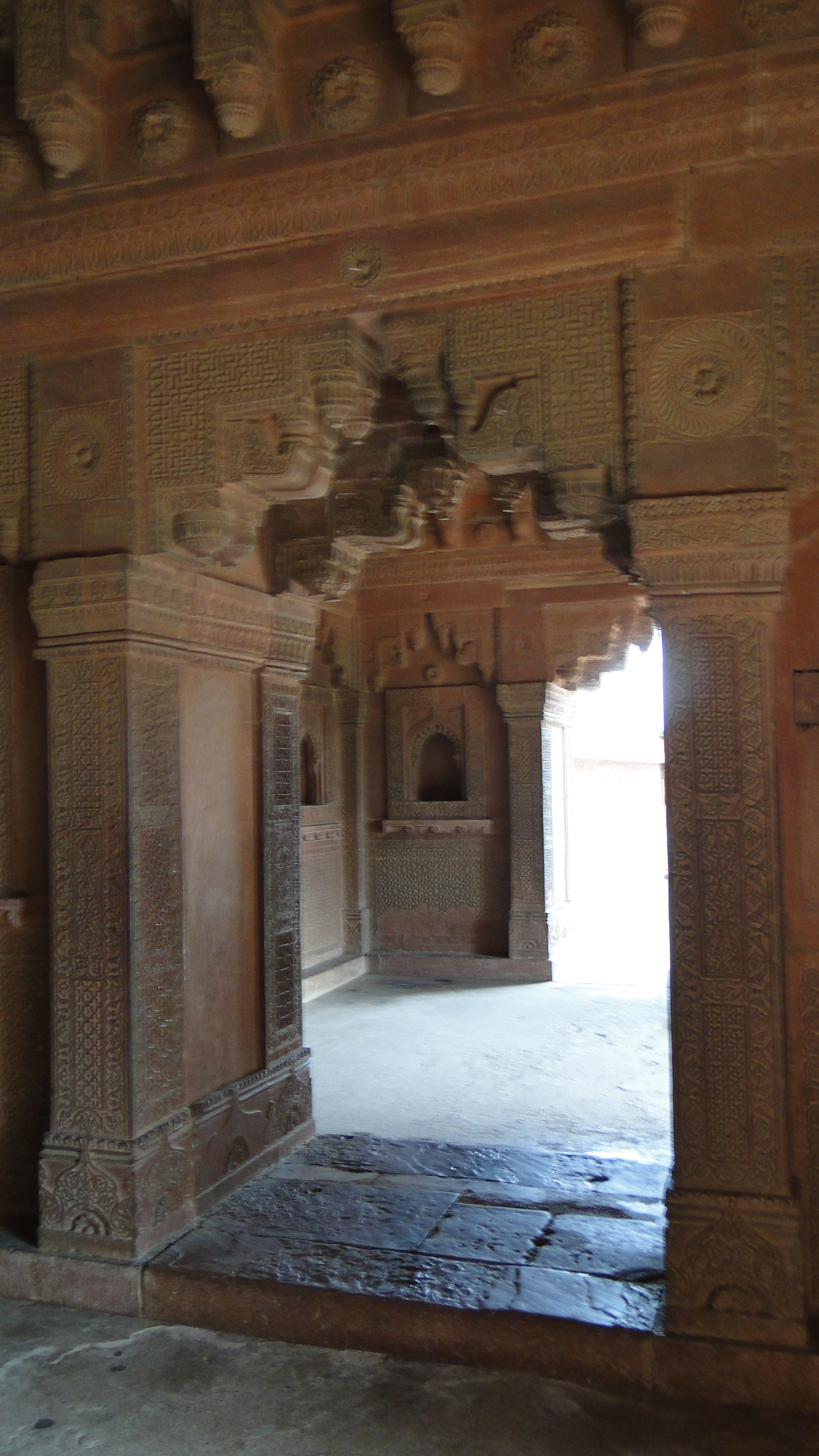
Archway inside the palace

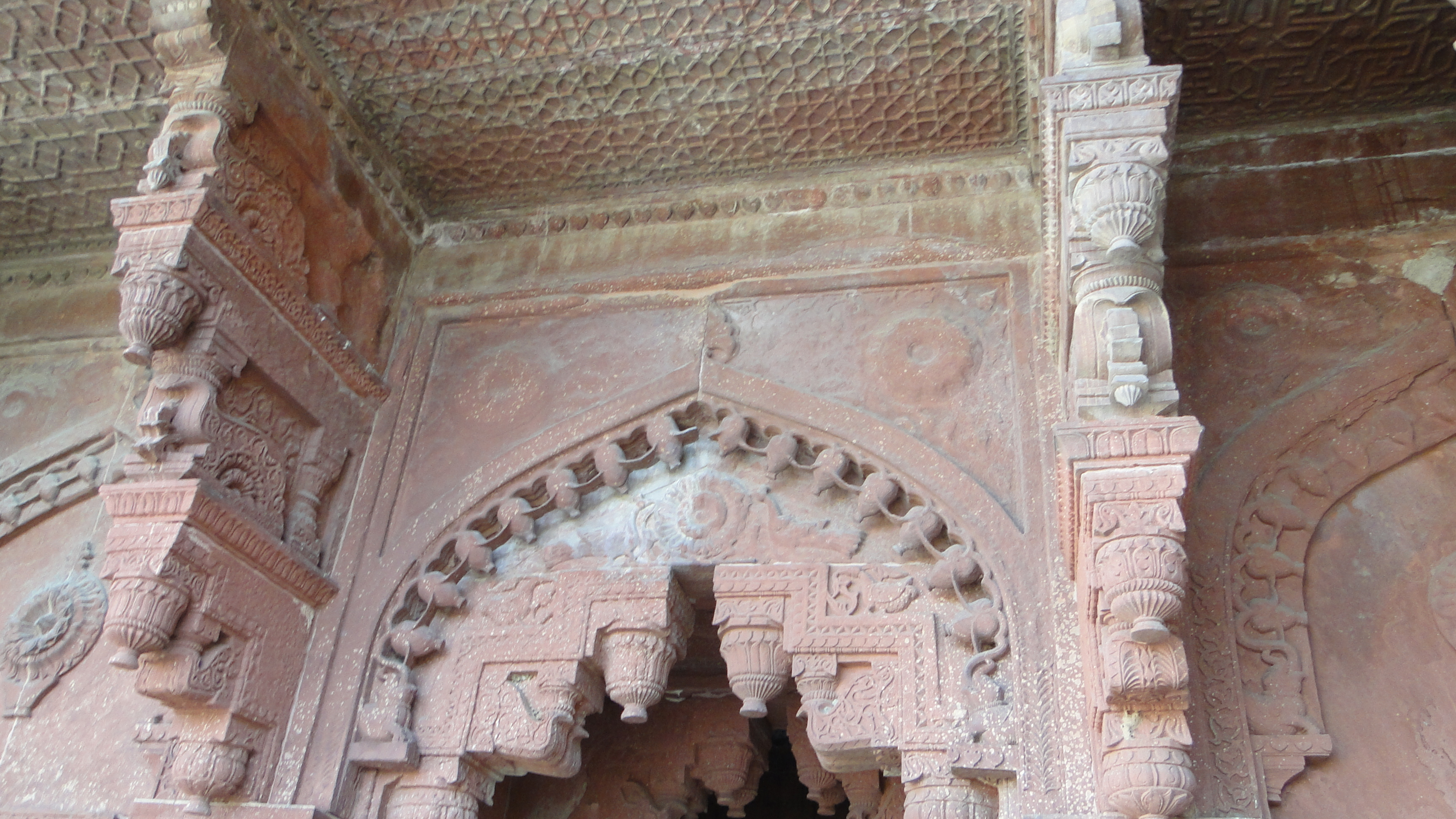
Intricately detailed carvings

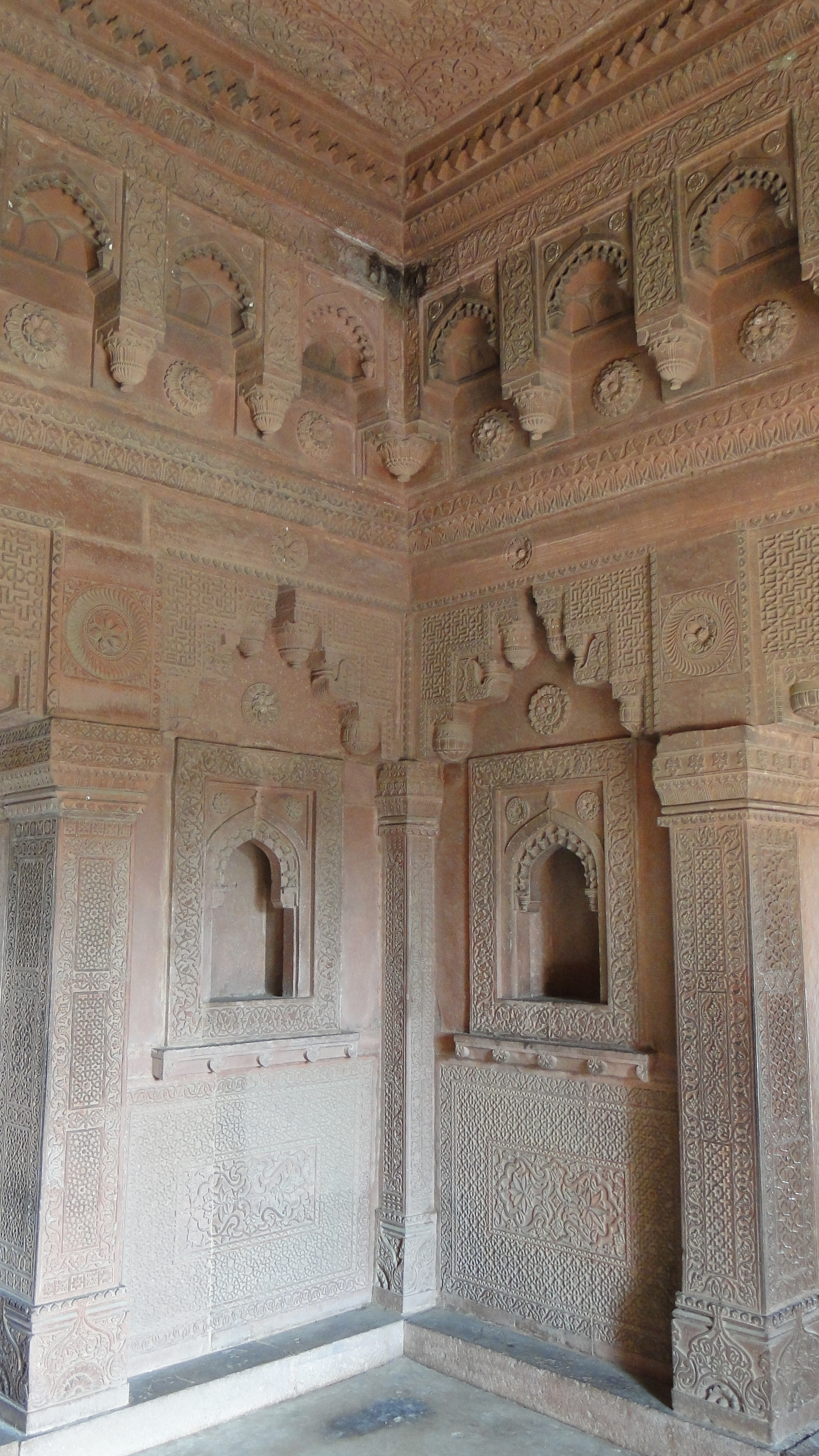
The inside of the palace

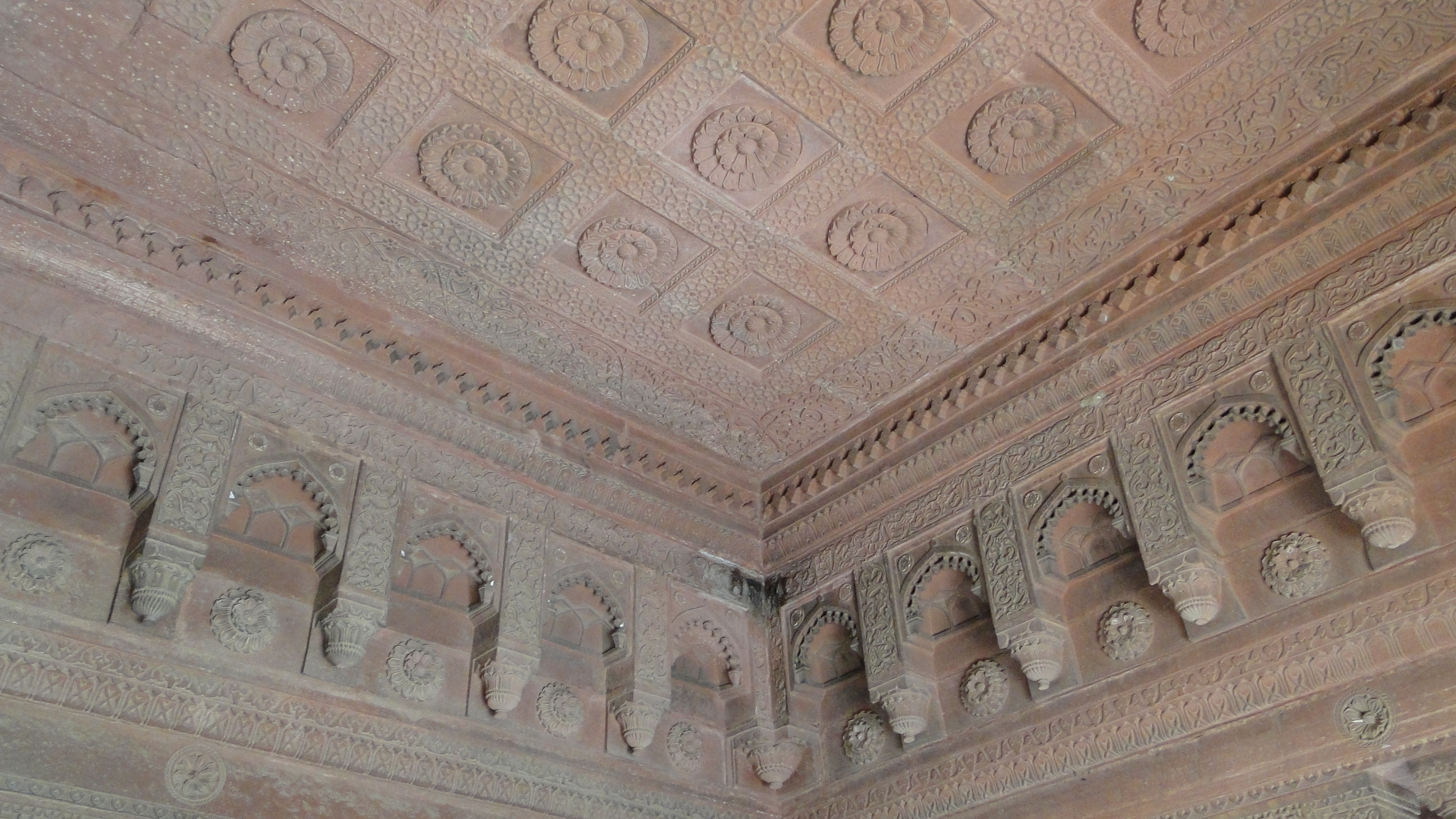
The ceiling inside
