= Jodha Bai Mahal =

Residential palace of Mughal empress Mariam-uz-Zamani

Coordinates: 27.0965°N 77.6648°E

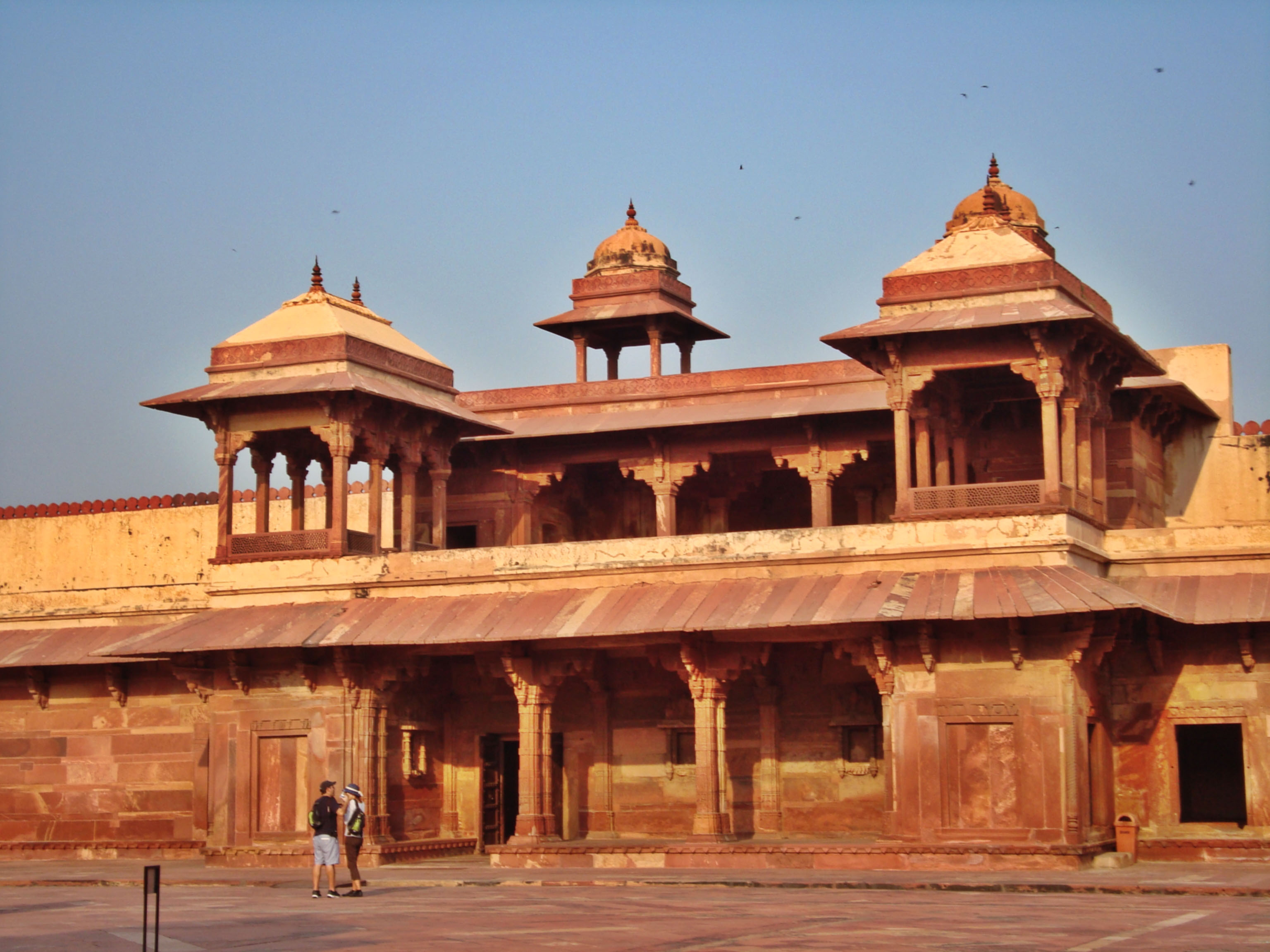
Backside of the grand gateway of Jodha Bai Mahal in Fatehpur Sikri

'Jodha Bai Mahal' also known incorrectly as 'Jodh Bai Mahal' is the largest palace in Fatehpur Sikri commissioned by Mughal Emperor Akbar in 1569 for his favourite queen, Mariam-uz-Zamani, commonly known as 'Jodha bai' . This Mahal is the largest complex of the zenana (palace for women belonging to the royal household). It is a masterpiece of the fusion of Hindu and Persian architecture made with red sandstone.

== History ==
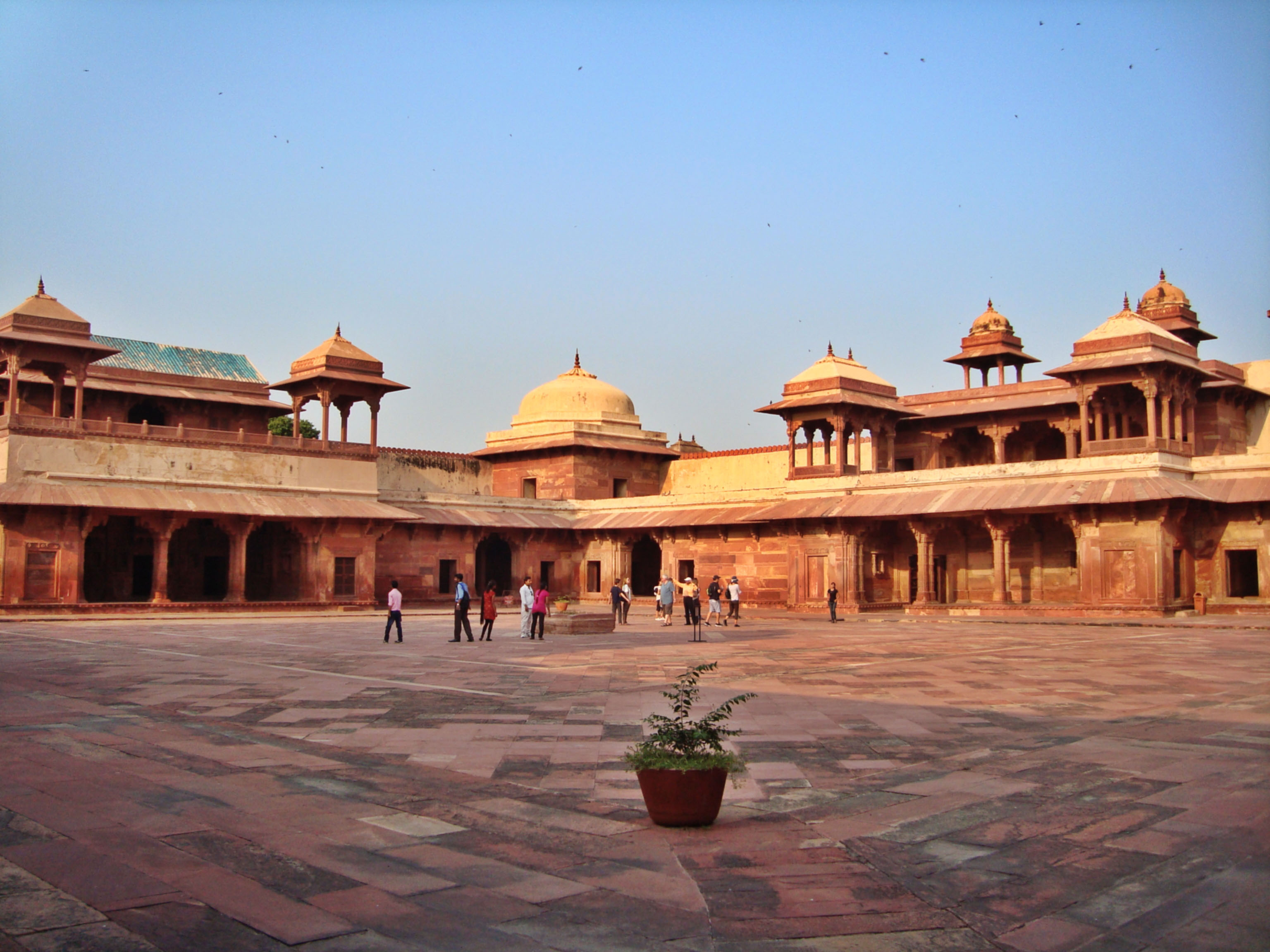
Jodha Bai Mahal In Fatehpur Sikri

"Having conducted a matrimonial alliance with the Hindu princess, Akbar spared no pains in making her new home resemble her old as much as possible"

— Edmund W. Smith, Moghul Architecture of Fathpur Sikri (1973)

Born as a Hindu princess, Mariam-uz-Zamani was married to Mughal emperor Akbar in the year 1562 as a result of a political alliance between Akbar and her father, Raja Bharmal. She gradually became his favourite wife and was the first wife of Akbar to honour the royal household with an heir. In the year 1569, she gave birth to her third and first surviving child of Akbar, Prince Salim. Akbar shifted his capital from Agra to Fatehpur Sikri in acknowledgement of his faith in the efficacy of the holy man's prayer, Sheikh Salim Chisti, whose blessings he sought for the birth of an heir to his empire. The construction in Sikri started in 1569 and a grand palace was established for the empress and her newborn son, prince Salim. This was the biggest residential palace in the city, and to this day it stands, though in ruins, as a monument of Akbar's love for the Amber princess.

== Architecture and ornamentation ==
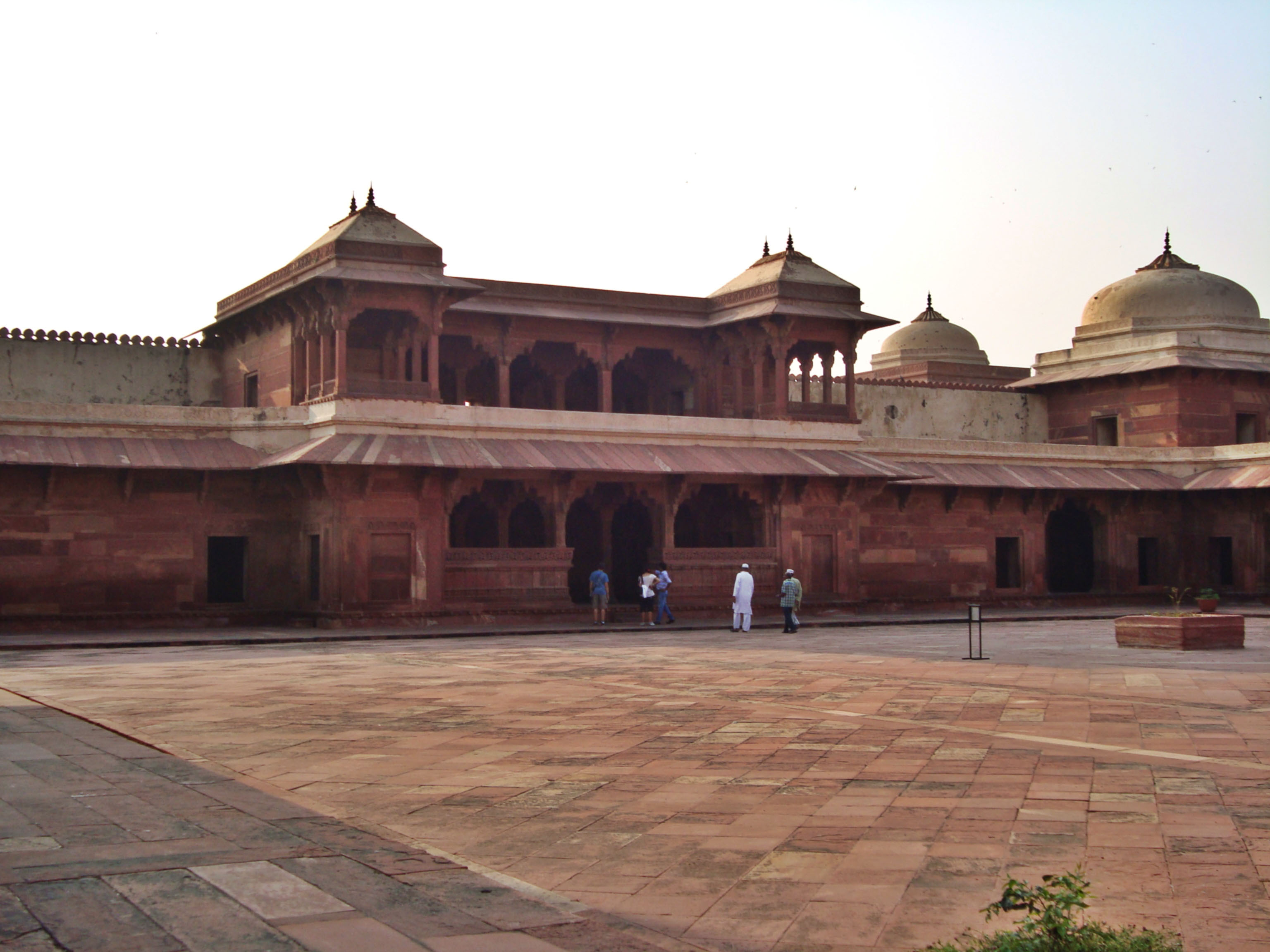
The distinctive Hindu style temple inside the palace used by the queen for worshipping

Jodha Bai Palace was commissioned by Akbar in her honour and was the largest residential palace in his harem. It is also known as Raniwas and Zenani Dyodhi. It shows the Rajasthani art influence and is built around a courtyard, with special care being taken to ensure privacy. This palace building consists of a rectangular block with a single magnificent gateway on the eastern side, which was protected by guard rooms, and has triangular ceilings, and other apartments. The eastern gateway of the palace is exceedingly magnificent and is of typical Rajasthani architecture.

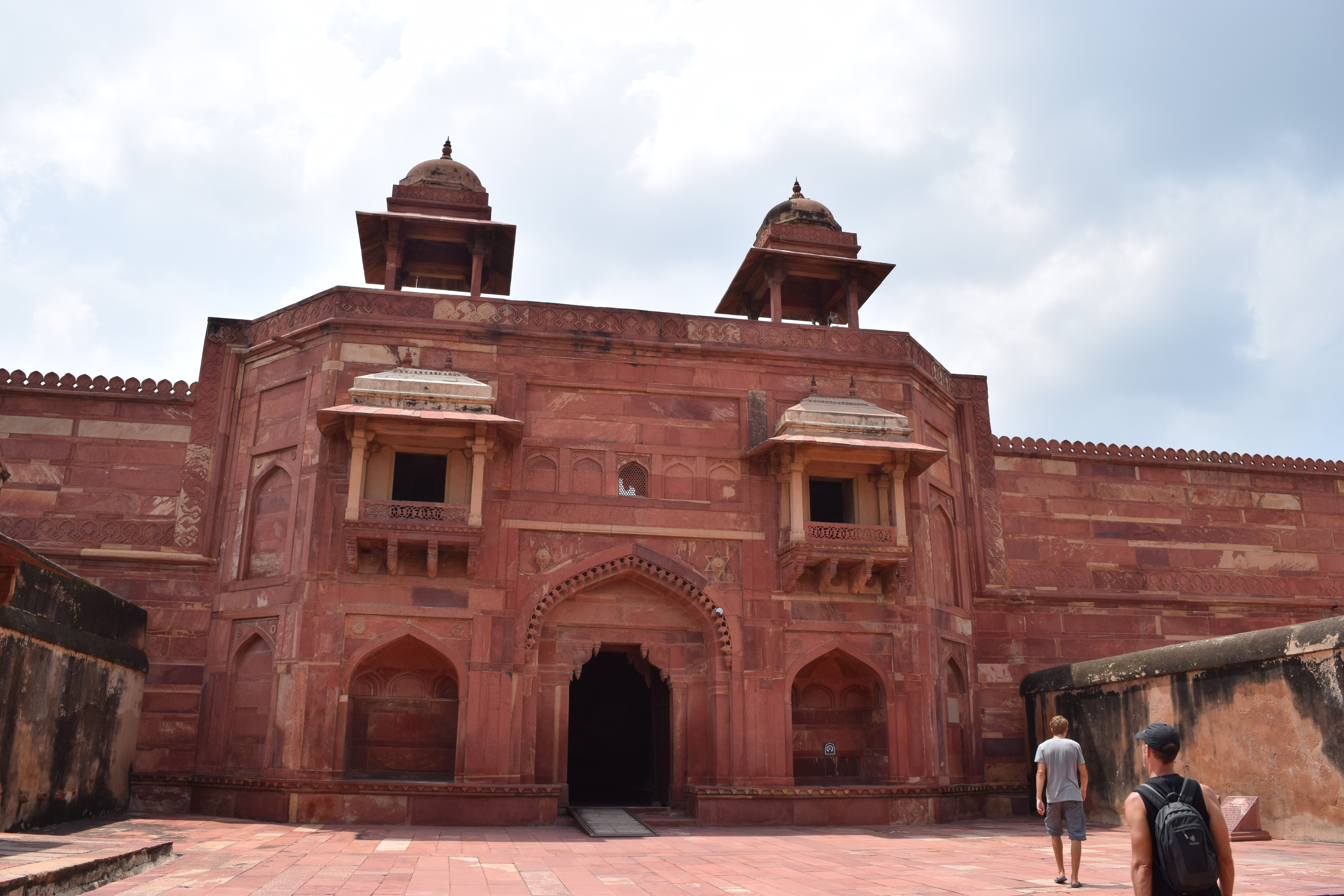
The majestic gateway of the Palace of Jodha Bai

The Khawabgah of this palace is a beautiful and spacious double-storey complex. The palace comprises a Hindu temple and a Tulsi math used by his Hindu wife for worship. This palace was internally also connected to the palace of Akbar. Several Hindu motifs have been used in the building alongside Lord Krishna depictions on the walls, which confirms that the occupant of the building was a Hindu lady.

This palace has distinct Gujarati and Rajasthani architectural patterns. Many motifs can be found in the interior like swans, elephants, parrots, Srivastava marks, etc. The western suite in the palace which served as a temple contains vedikas and other Hindu motifs. It contains beautiful curvilinear pillars with brackets. The superstructure of the building comprises chhatris, pillars with wall brackets, semicircular domes, and several niches. The palace is built with red sandstone making it seem captivating.

== Gallery ==
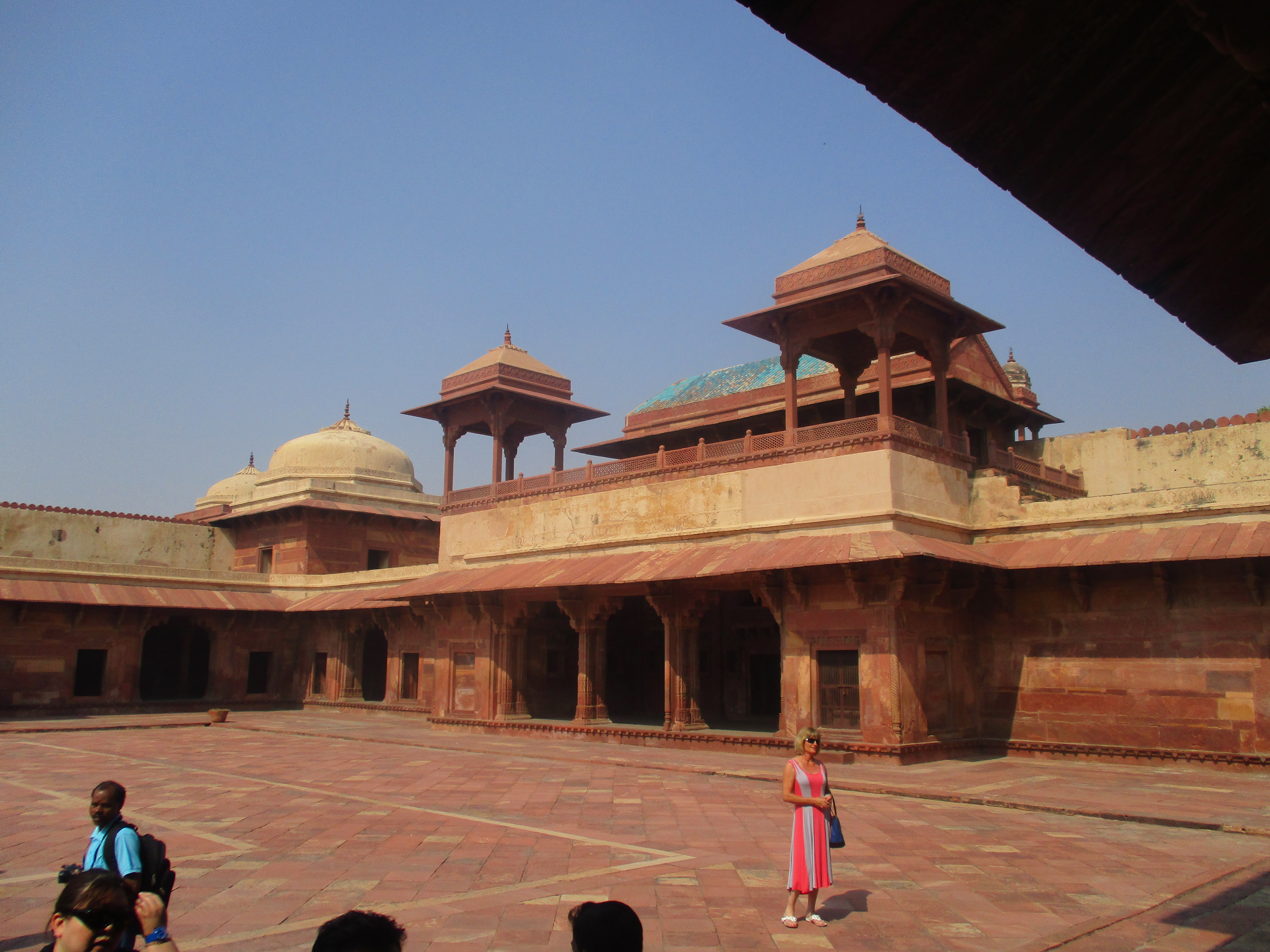
The bedroom complex inside the palace

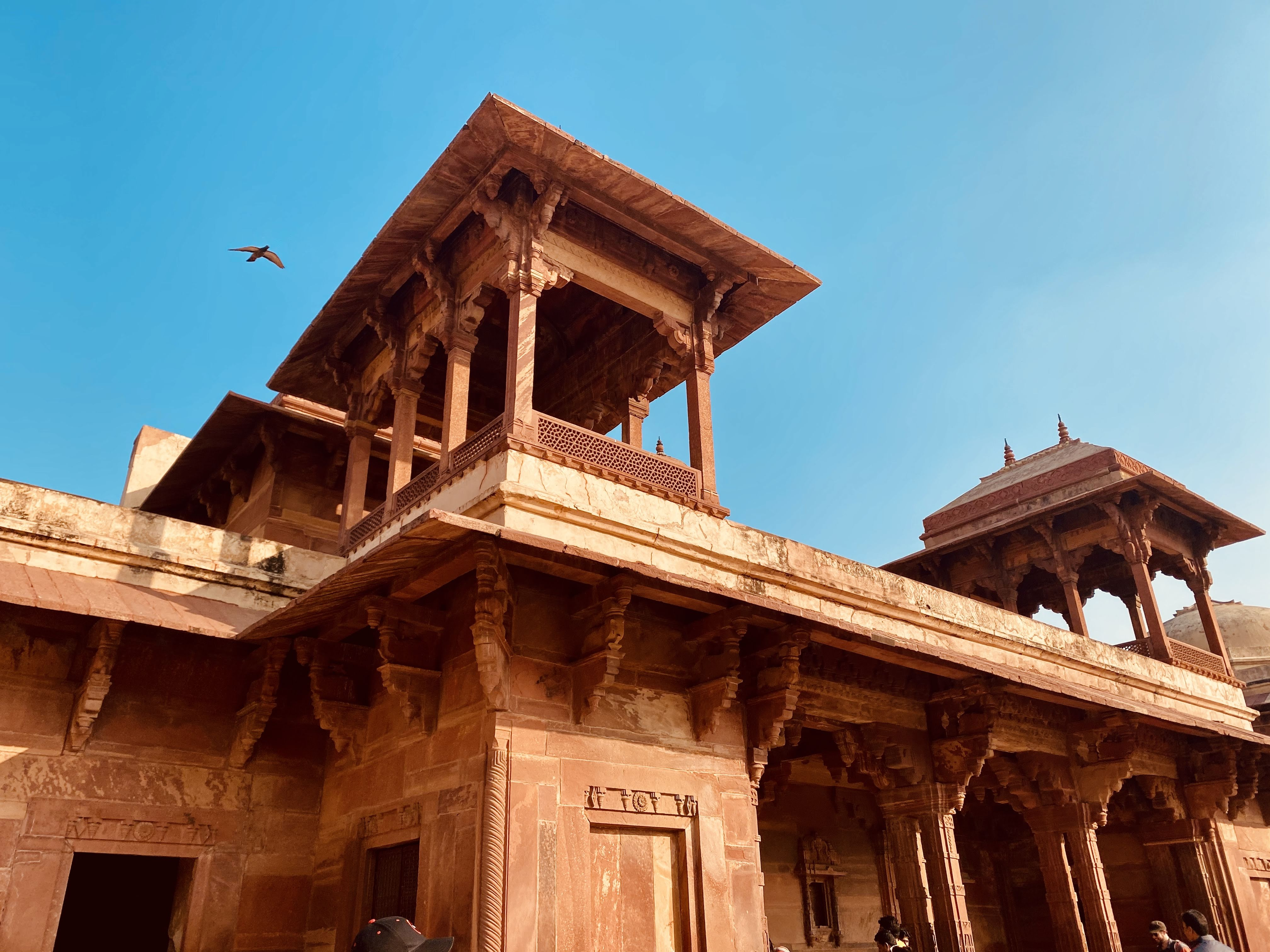
Entrance to Queen's Palace

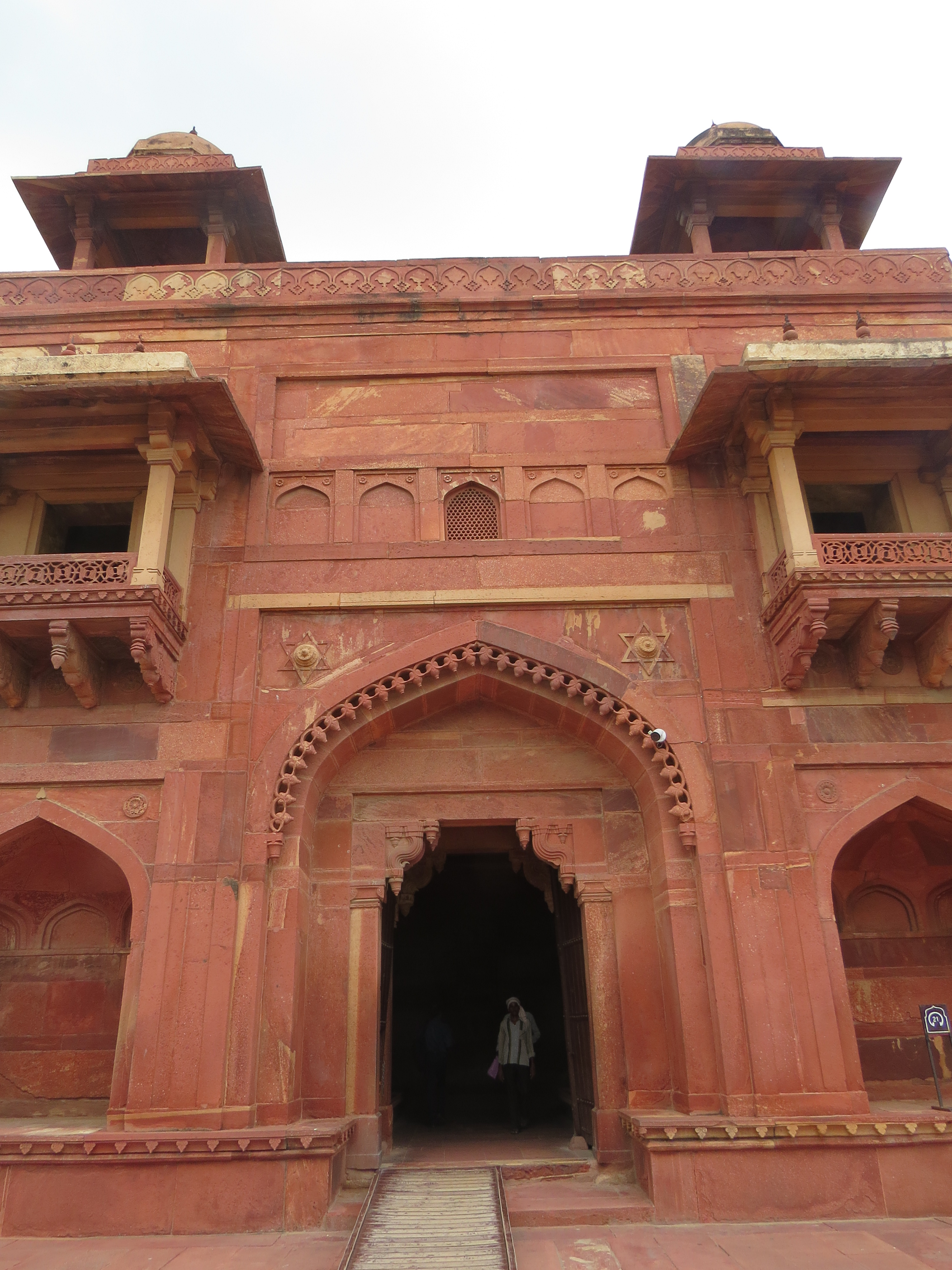
The Rajasthani style-influenced entrance to Empress Palace

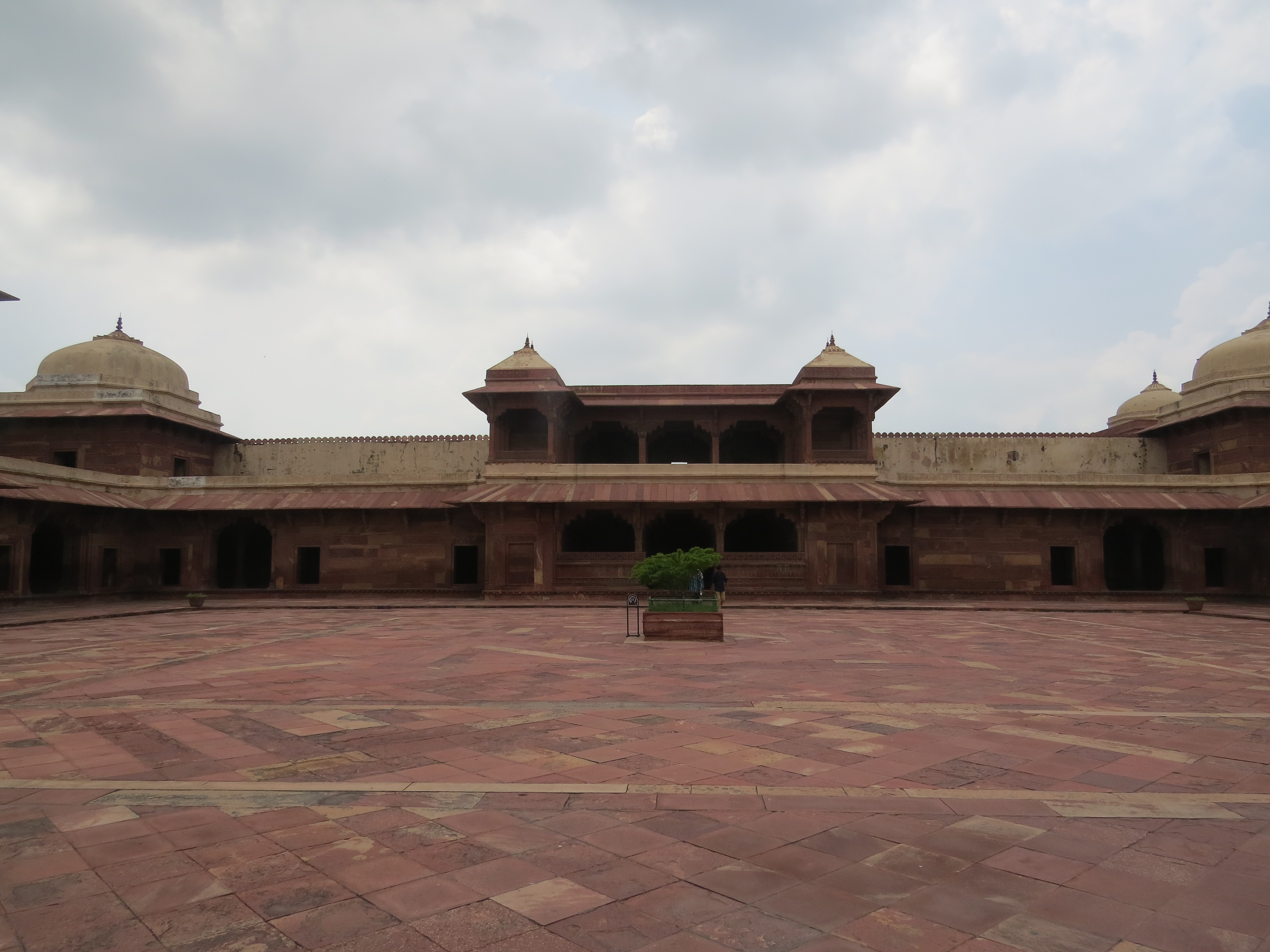
Tulsi math in front of the temple in queen's Palace

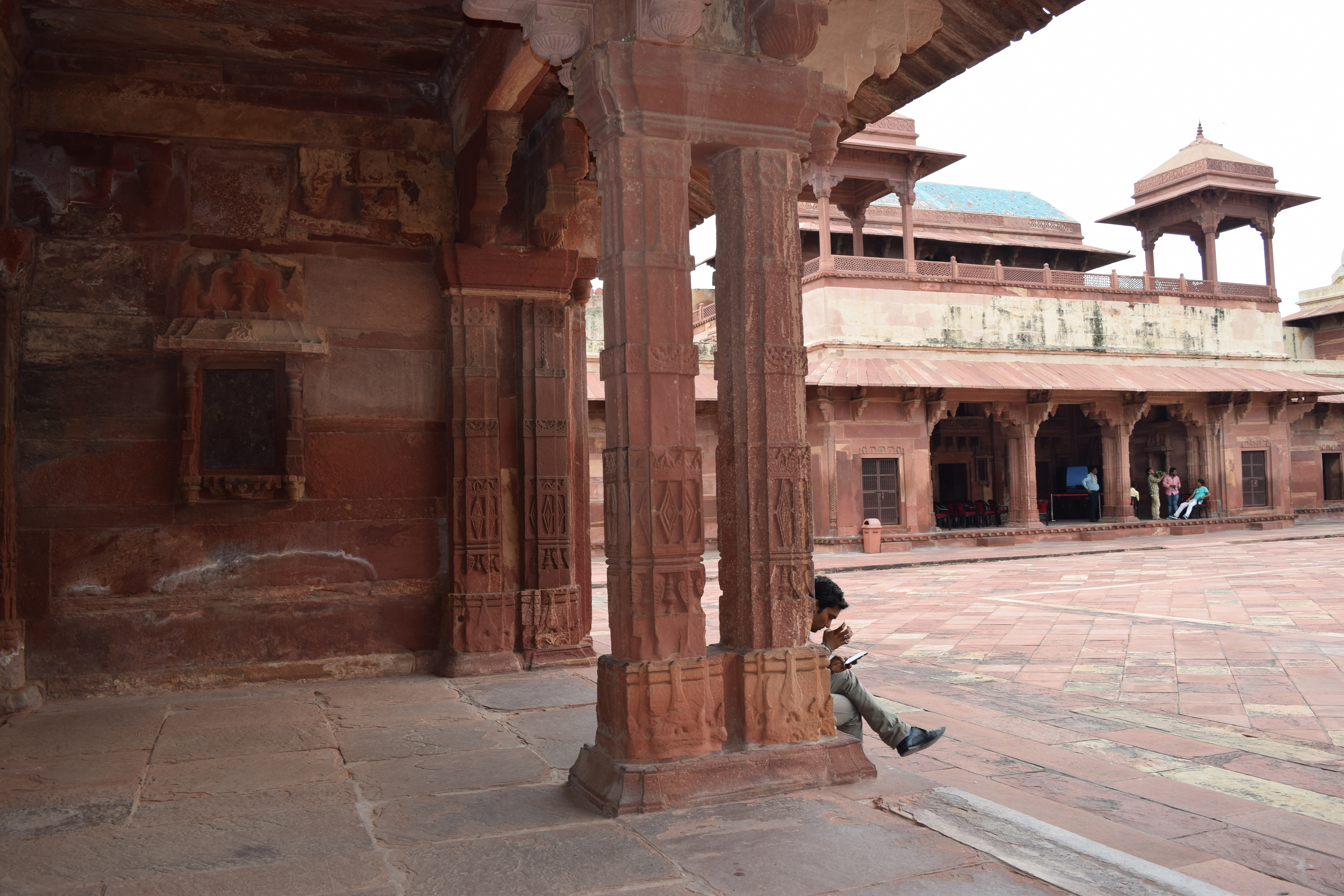
Hindu architectural design on the pillars of the temple inside Jodha Bai Mahal

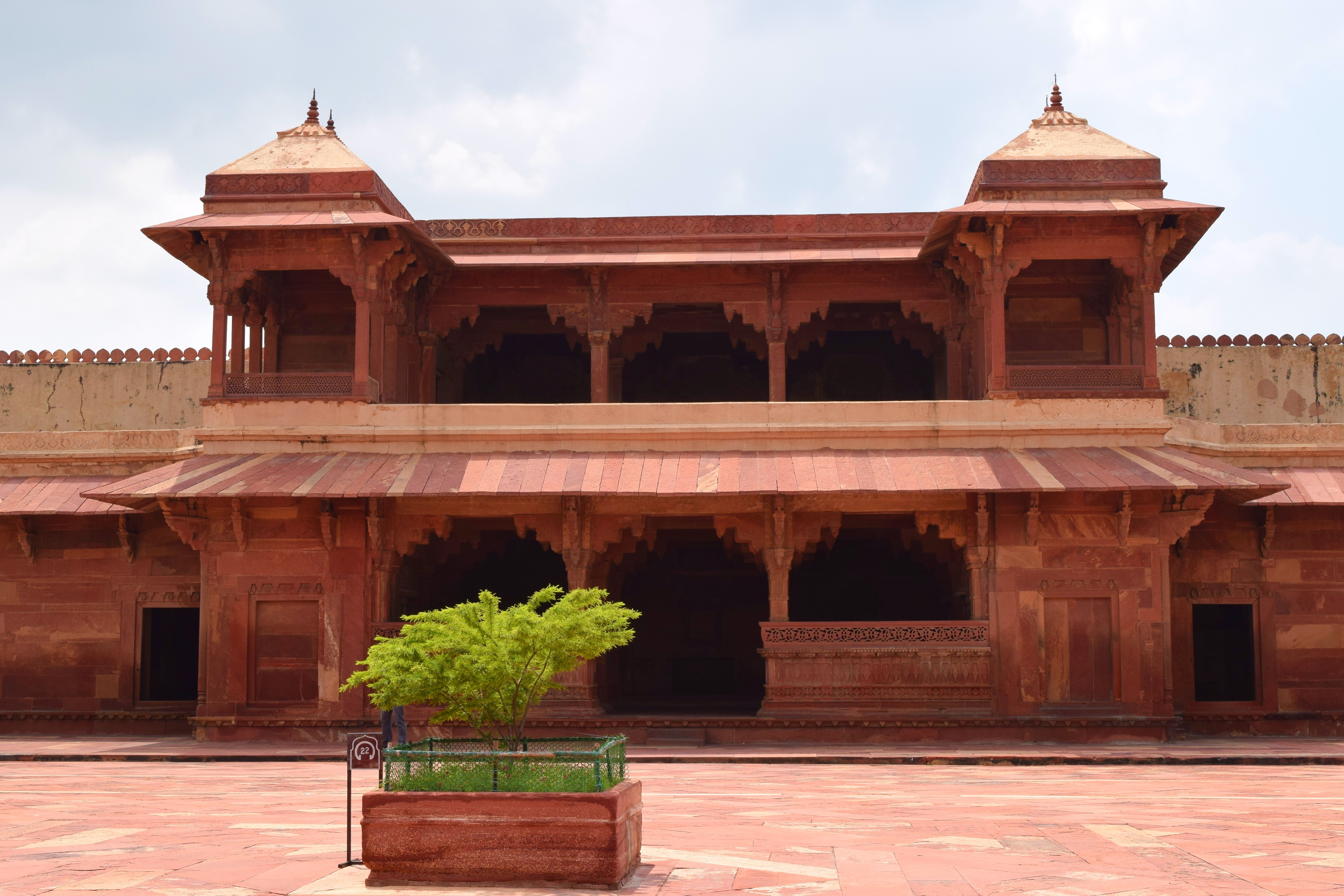
Temple with a tulsi math in the middle of the courtyard

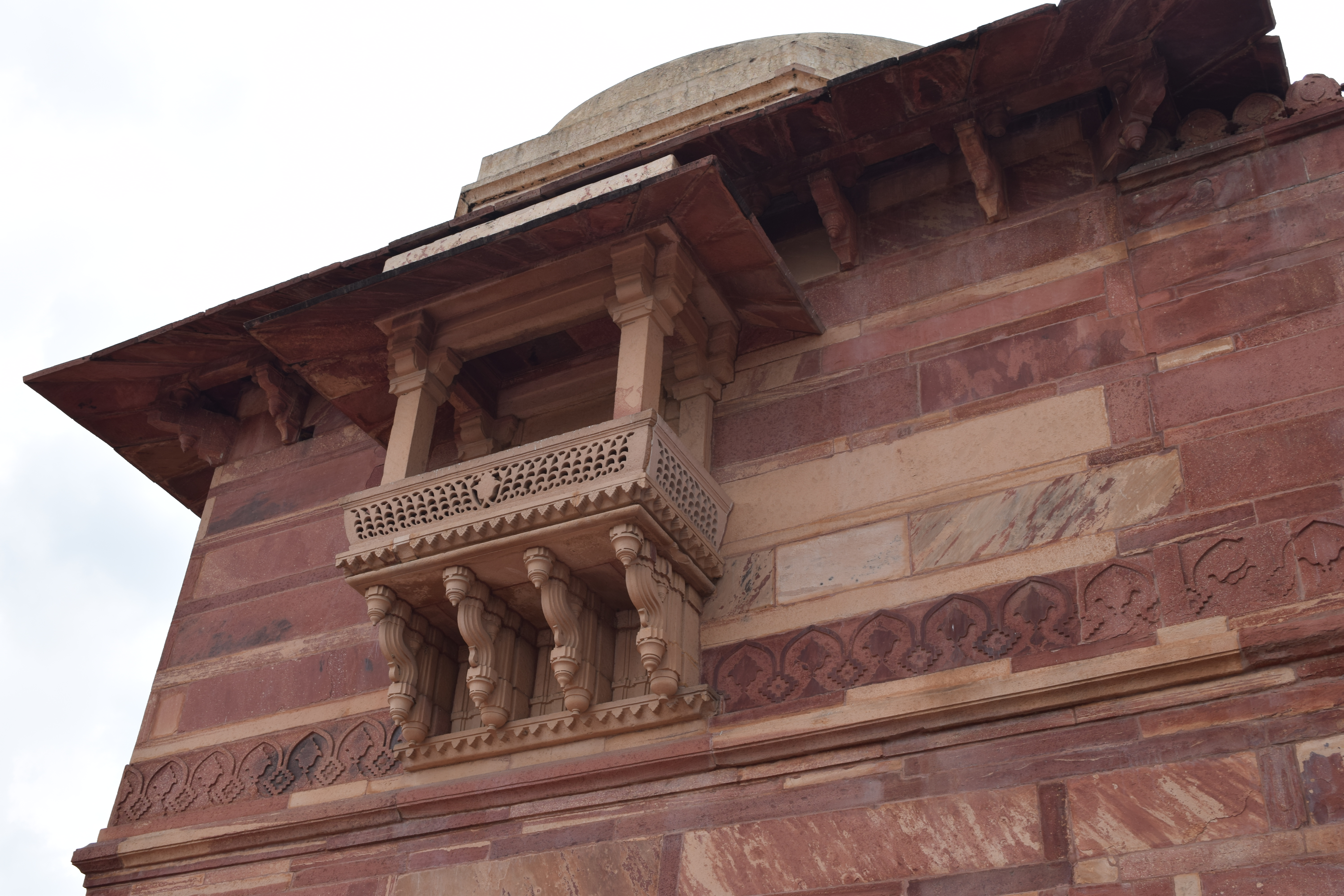
Rajasthani style chattris in the faux window. A typical example of medieval period Hindu architecture

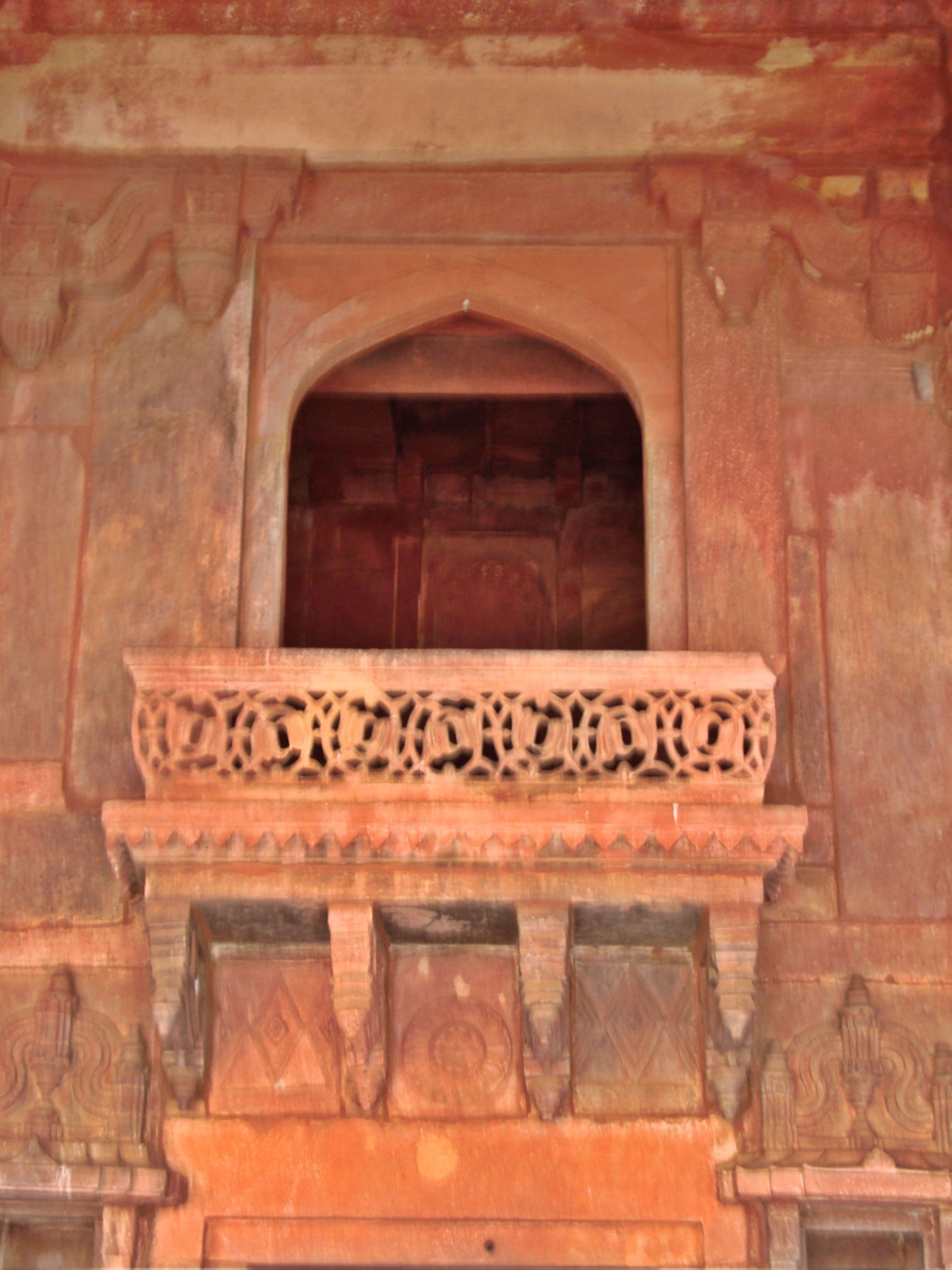
A window with Mughal and Rajasthani culture style

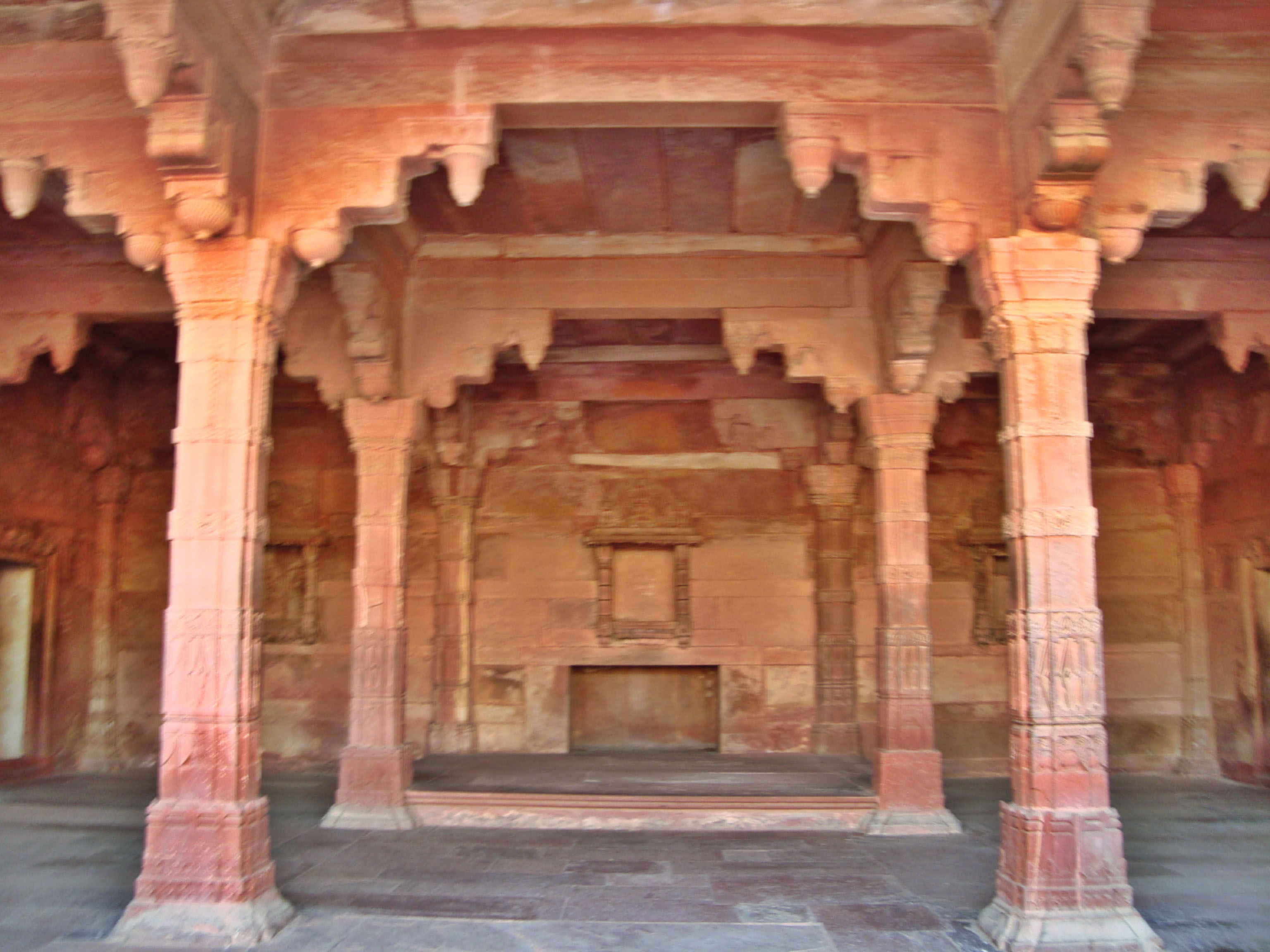
The open style Hindu temple inside the palace

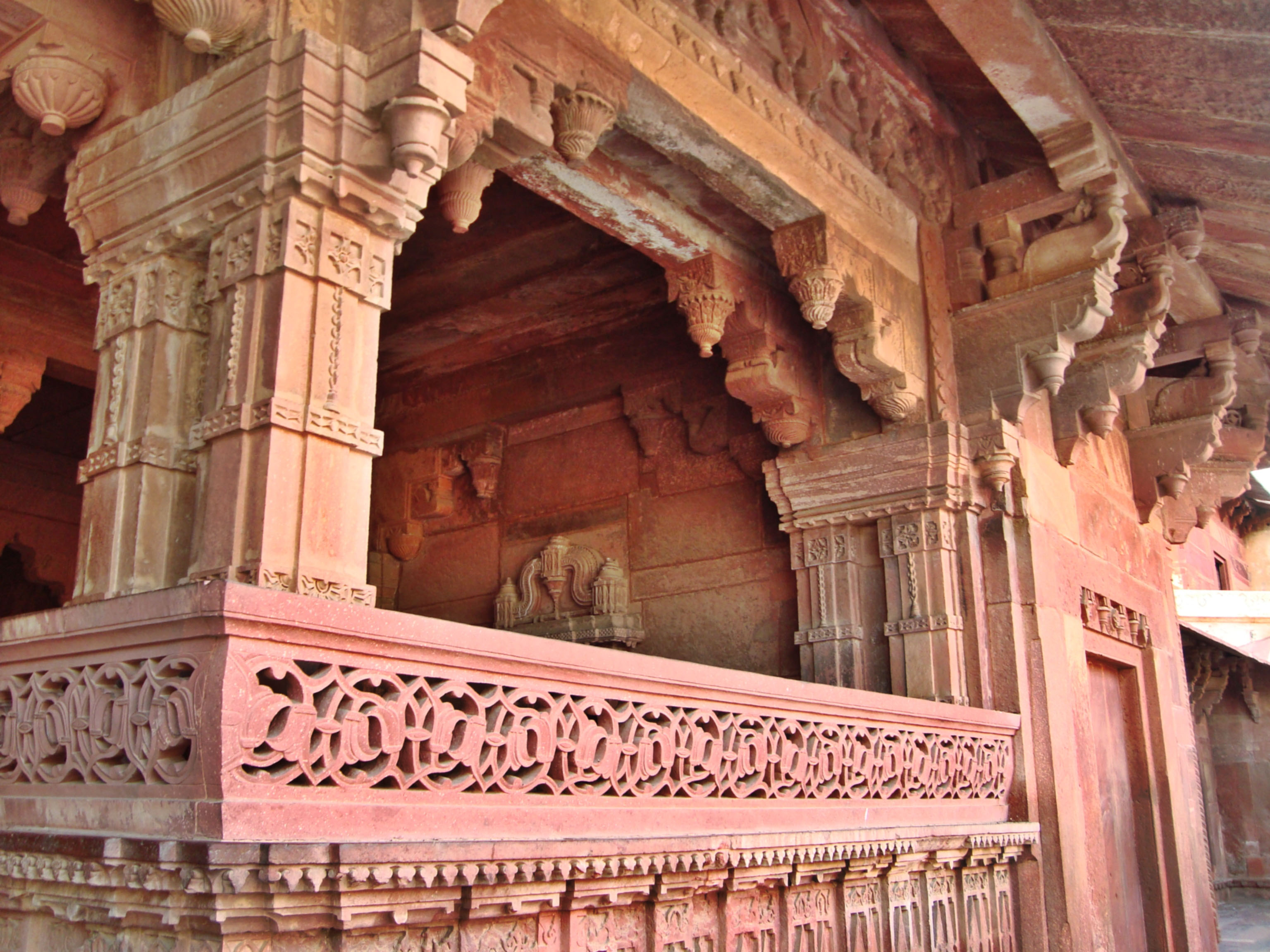
An example of the textural amalgamation of Mughal and Rajasthani design

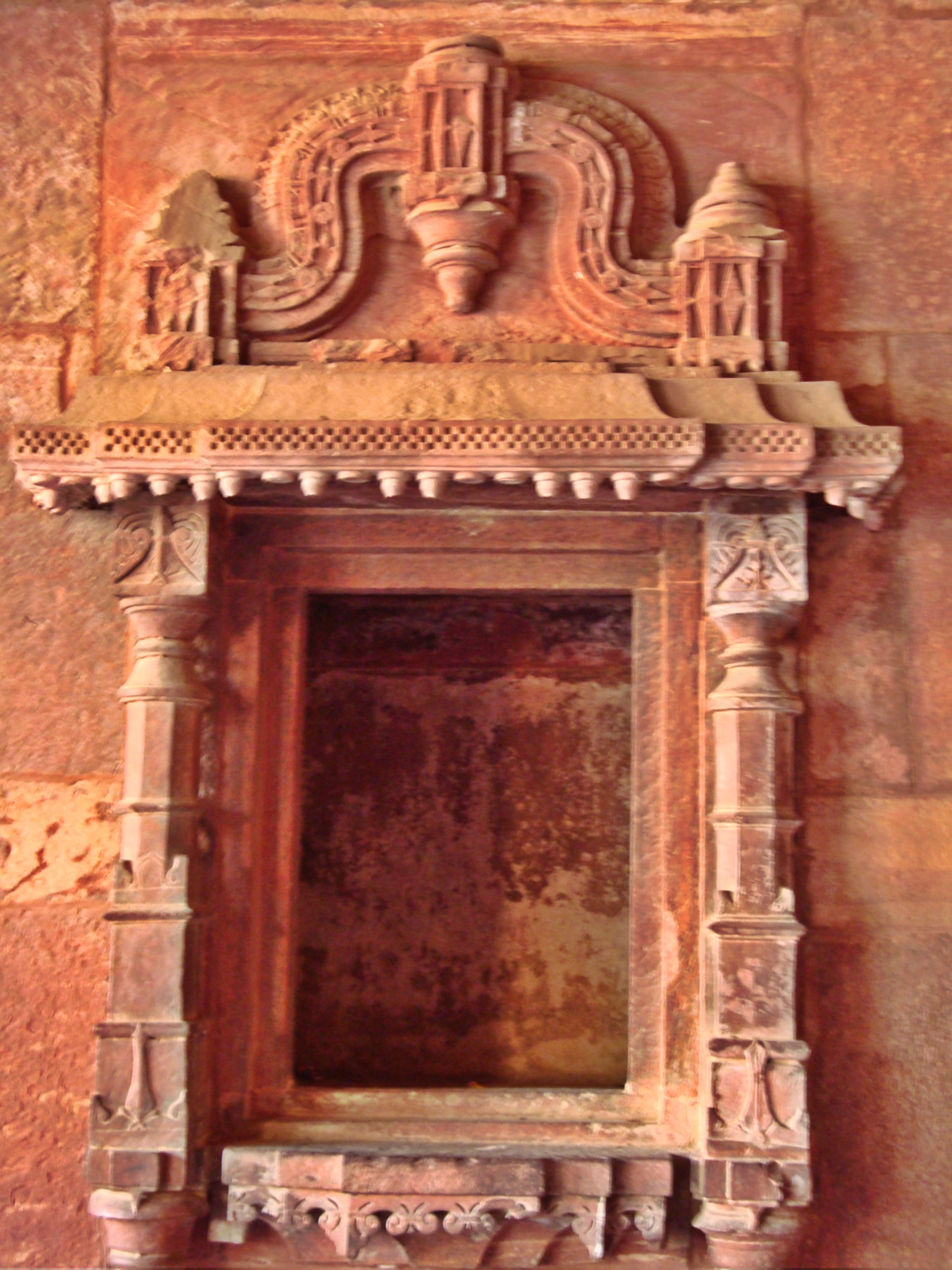
A typical faux window design showing Rajasthani and Gujrat influence in the Palace

== See also ==
- Jahangiri Mahal
- Birbal Mahal
- Sunehra Makan Mahal
- Ibadat Khana
- Panch Mahal
