= Rodolfo Acquaviva =

Jesuit missionary

Blessed Rodolfo Acquaviva SJ
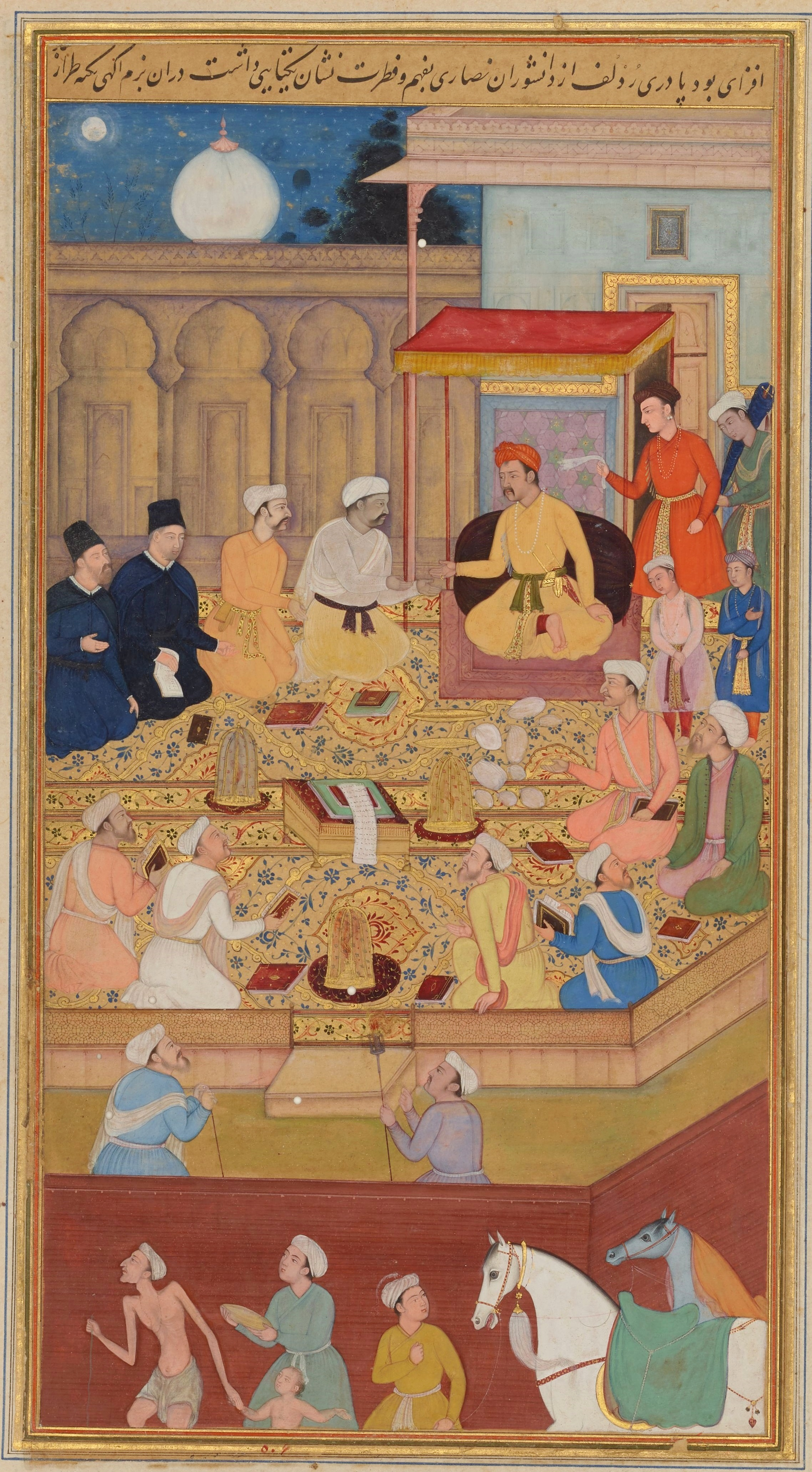
- (c. 1556-1605) at the Ibadat Khana. At the left in blue is Bl. Acquaviva with his companion Fr. Henriques at his side. Illustration to the Akbarnama, ca. 1605

Martyr
- Born: 2 October 1550; Atri, Abruzzo, Italy
- Died: 25 July 1583 (aged 32); Cuncolim, Goa, Portuguese India
- Venerated in: Roman Catholic Church
- Beatified: 1893 by Pope Leo XIII
- Feast: 4 February

Rodolfo Acquaviva, SJ (2 October 1550 – 25 July 1583) was an Italian Jesuit missionary and priest in India who served the court of Akbar the Great from 1580 to 1583. He was killed in 1583 and beatified in 1893.

== Family ==
Rodolfo Acquaviva was the son of Giangirolamo Acquaviva, the 10th Duke of Atri. He was the great-grandson of Andrea Matteo Acquaviva, condottiere and man of letters. Rodolfo (also known as Rudolfo) belonged to a powerful and illustrious family of Germanic origin settled in the Kingdom of Naples since the twelfth century. His mother was Marguerite Pio, where on his mother's side, he was a cousin of Aloysius Gonzaga.

== Priesthood ==
In April 1568, inspired by the example of his uncle Claudio Acquaviva, who later became the 5th General of the Jesuits, he too joined the Society of Jesus. He became a novice at Sant'Andrea al Quirinale in Rome together with Stanislas Kostka. After completing his studies, Acquaviva was chosen by his superiors for the prestigious and challenging Indian missions, begun by Francis Xavier in the Portuguese territory of Goa. He then travelled to Lisbon, the starting point for the eastern voyage, where he was ordained as a priest and sailed for India in 1578.

== At Akbar's Court ==
At first Acquaviva taught at Saint Paul's College, Goa but was then assigned as the leader of a mission to the court of the Grand Mughal Akbar (1542–1605) who had requested missionaries be sent. In his new palace in Fatehpur Sikri Akbar built the Ibadat Khana (House of Worship) where he invited leaders of the Muslim, Hindu and other religions to debate points of religious truth, including Acquaviva and his companion Jesuit António de Monserrate (Antoni de Montserrat in his native Catalan), and their young translator, Francisco Henriques, who spoke Persian. Akbar was interested in founding a new pantheistic religion with elements from different traditions, and his new faith was called Din-i-Ilahi ("Faith of the Divine").

Although Acquaviva came equipped with the Bible translated into many different languages, (though not yet Persian) and was the object of Akbar's sympathetic personal attention, the Jesuit felt his efforts were fruitless, one obstacle being the ruler's repugnance to monogamy, and after three years, decided to withdraw, though other Jesuits maintained the mission at the courts of the Mughal Emperors and in Agra for the next two centuries.

== Martyrdom ==
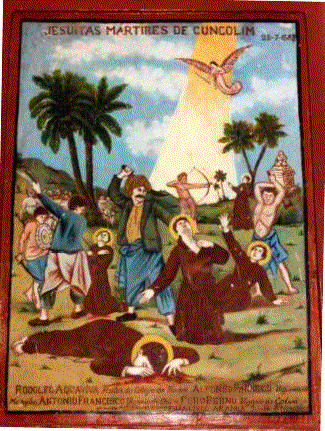
A 17th-century painting in a church in Colva depicting the massacre of the five Jesuits in Cuncolim, Goa on 25 July 1583. Acquaviva in the centre uncovering his neck.

Upon his return to Goa as part of his missionary commitments, Acquaviva led a mission to the Hindu Kshatriyas of Salcette, south of Goa. This was seen as a provocation by the locals, inciting the Cuncolim Revolt of July 1583. Acquaviva had his throat cut while praying to God.

== Beatification ==
Acquaviva and his four Jesuit companions were beatified by Pope Leo XIII in 1893. He is commemorated with the Jesuit martyrs of the missions on 4 February by the order and its institutions.

== Sources ==
- Daniello Bartoli, Missione al Gran Mogor del p. Ridolfo Acquaviva della Compagnia di Gesu, sua vita e morte (1663); Salerno (1998);Googlebook (1714)
- Sir Edward Maclagan, The Jesuits and the Great Mogul (1932)
- Herbermann, Charles, ed. (1913). "Martyrs of Cuncolim" . Catholic Encyclopedia. New York: Robert Appleton Company.
- Teotonio de Souza, Why Cuncolim Martyrs?
- Youri Martini, Akbar e i Gesuiti. Missionari cristiani alla corte del Gran Moghul, Il Pozzo di Giacobbe, Trapani 2018, ISBN 978-8861246911
