= Ibadat Khana =

Meeting house built in 1575 by Mughal Emperor Akbar for interfaith dialogue

Ibādat Khāna
- House of Worship
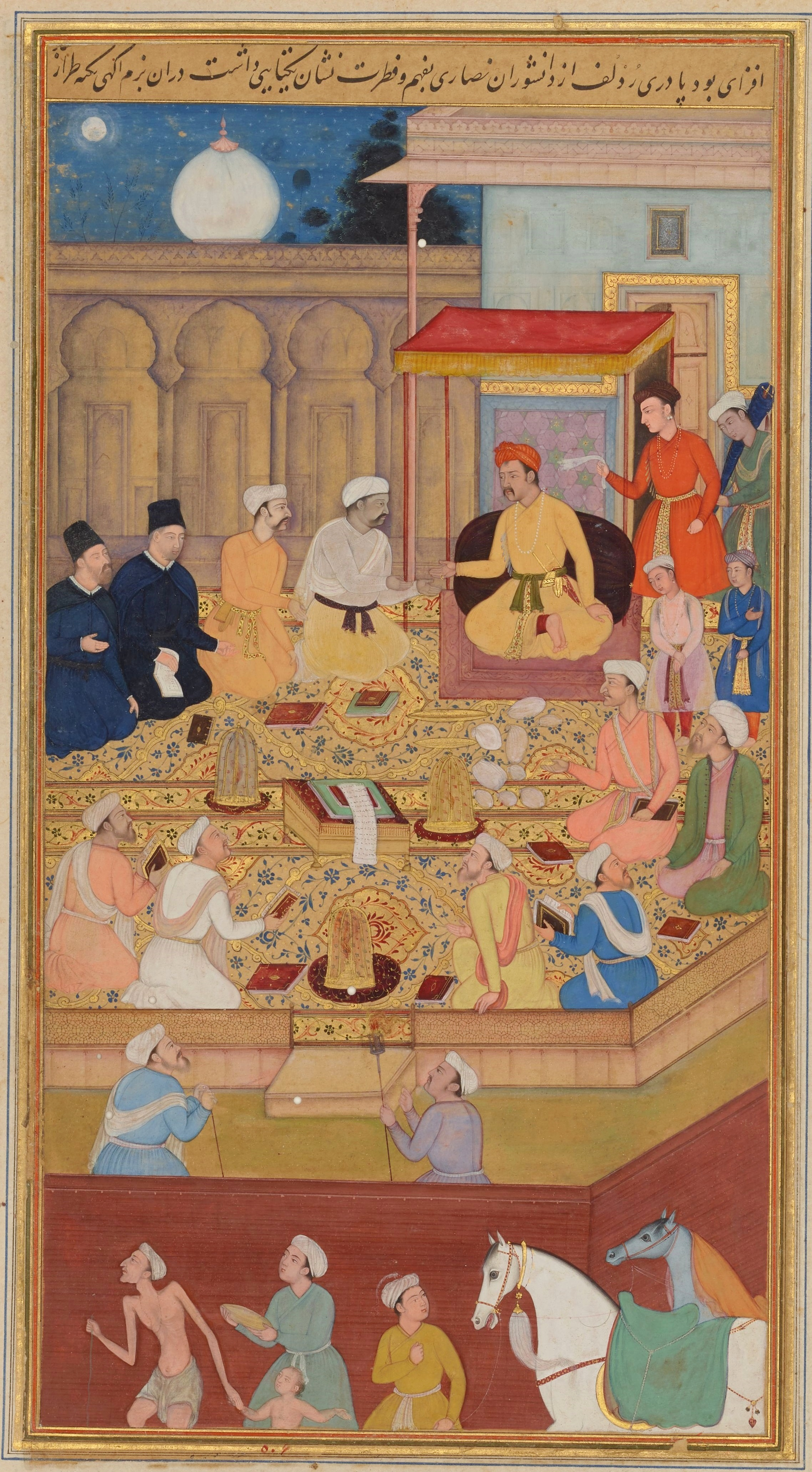
- Akbar the Great holds a religious assembly in the Ibādat Khāna; the two men dressed in black are the Jesuit missionaries Rodolfo Acquaviva and Francisco Henriques. Illustration to the Akbarnama by Nar Singh, c. 1605.

Religion
- Region: Fatehpur Sikri

Location
- Country: Mughal Empire
- Interactive map of Ibādat Khāna

Architecture
- Founder: Emperor Akbar
- Established: c. 1575

The Ibādat Khāna (House of Worship) was a meeting house built in 1575 CE by the Mughal Emperor Akbar (r. 1556–1605) at Fatehpur Sikri to gather spiritual/religious leaders of different religious grounds (and beliefs) so as to conduct a discussion and debates on the teachings of the respective religious leaders (if any).

In his eagerness to learn about different religions, Akbar built a hall of prayer at Fatehpur Sikri in 1575 known as the Ibadat Khana. At this place, he invited selected mystics, intellectuals and theologians, and held discussions on religious and spiritual themes. He invited scholars belonging to various religions such as Hinduism, Islam, Zoroastrianism, Christianity and even atheists. He conducted religious debates with these people. They visited Ibadat Khana in the past and discussed their religious belief (and faiths) with Akbar. The result of these discussions at the Hall of Prayer led them to the conclusion that all religions lead to the same goal.

== Historical background ==
Akbar built the Ibādat Khāna as a debating house. He encouraged Hindus, Catholics, Zoroastrians, Jains, Buddhists, Sikhs and even atheists to participate. Religious leaders and philosophers from around this diverse empire, as well as those passing through, were invited to Akbar's Thursday evening discussions. Akbar's spiritual inclinations were roused to a large extent by the example of Sulaiman Karrani, a past ruler of Bengal, who was said to spend nights in the company of over a hundred ratiocinating spiritual men. Akbar also wanted to sharpen his theological grasp because he had been told of the imminent arrival to his court of Mirza Sulaiman of Badakshan, a Sufi with a predilection for spiritual debates.

=== Faith of the Divine ===
By the late 1580s CE, Akbar began an attempt to reconcile the differences of all religions by creating a new faith, the Din-i-Ilahi ("Faith of the Divine"), which incorporated both pantheistic versions of Islamic Sufism (most notably Ibn Arabi's doctrine of Wahdat al-Wujud or Unity of Existence) and Bhakti or devotional movements of Hinduism. Even some elements of Christianity (like crosses), Zoroastrianism (fire ceremonies) and Jainism were amalgamated in the new religion. Akbar was greatly influenced by the teachings of Jain Acharyas Hir Vijay Suri and Jin Chandra Suri and gave up non-vegetarian food because of their influence. He declared Amari or non-killing of animals on the holy days of Jains like Paryushan and Mahavir Jayanti. He rolled back the Jizya tax from Jain pilgrimage places like Palitana.

This faith, however, was not for the masses. In fact, the only "converts" to this new religion were the upper nobility of Akbar's court. Historians have so far been able to identify only 18 members of this new religion, including his closest minister Birbal.

Alfred, Lord Tennyson's poem Akbar’s Dream lauds the Ibādat Khāna, ascribing tolerance and humanity to his "Divine Faith", while implicitly criticising the intolerance of 19th century British Christianity.

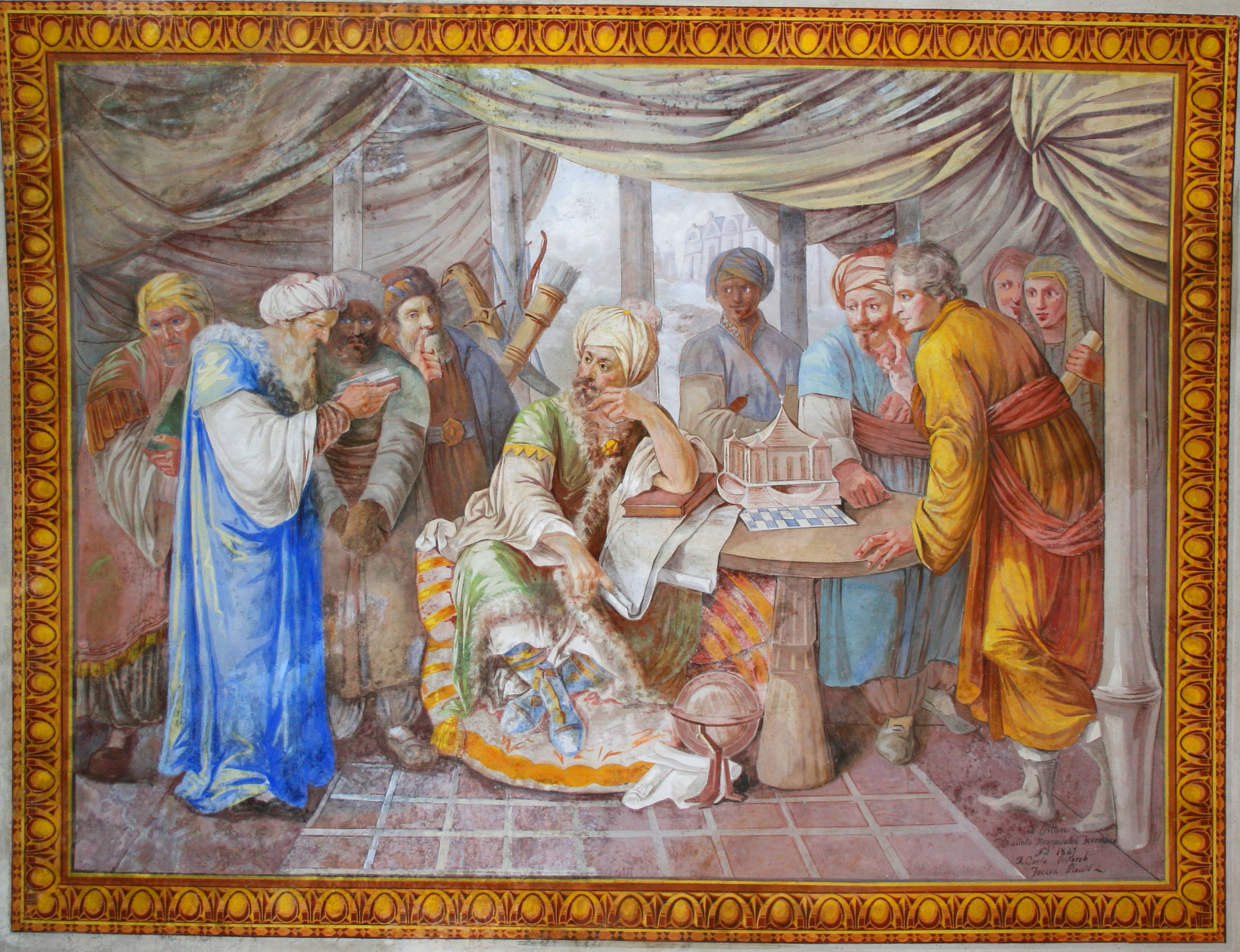
A painting depicting the scenes of the Ibādat Khāna.

== Discovery of Ibadat Khana ==
Different archaeologists and historians had different thoughts on the location of Ibadat Khana. Saeed Ahmed Mararavi, followed by Athar Abbas Rizvi and Vincent Flynn suggested that the mound between the jama masjid (congregational mosque) and Jodha Bai's Mahal is the site of Ibadat Khana. However, they had no tangible proof to support their argument. In early 1980s, K. K. Muhammed, working under R. C. Gaur of Aligarh Muslim University, excavated the mound and found the steps, platforms and boundary wall, which matched the painting of Ibadat Khana from Akbar's period.

== See also ==
- Akbar the Great
- Dabestan-e Mazaheb
- Din-i-Ilahi
- Fatehpur Sikri
- Taj Mahal
- Jama Masjid, Delhi
- Tomb of Salim Chishti
- Jodha Bai Mahal
- Naubat Khana
