= Din-i Ilahi =

Syncretic religion of Mughal emperor Akbar

- دین الهی
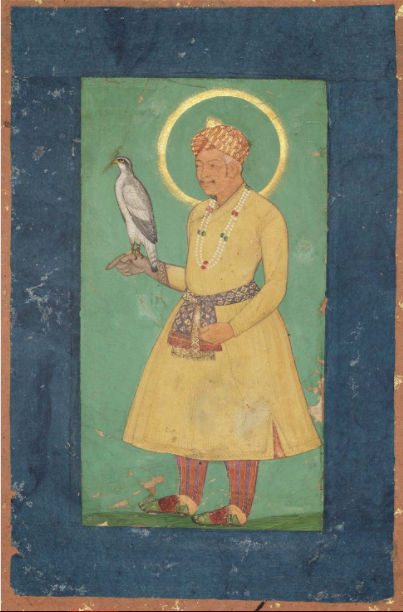
- Impression of Akbar, who ruled the Mughal Empire from 1556 to 1605 (Museum of Fine Arts Boston, dated c. 17th century)
- Type: Syncretic religion
- Classification: Abrahamic and Dharmic (and partly Iranic)
- Theology: Monotheistic
- Region: Indian subcontinent
- Language: None (no holy scripture)
- Possessions: Ibadat Khana
- Founder: Jalal-ud-Din Muhammad Akbar
- Origin: 1582; Fatehpur Sikri, Agra, Mughal Empire
- Separated from: Islam
- Defunct: c. 1605
- Members: 19
- Other name: Tawḥīd-i-Ilāhī (توحید الهی)

Dīn-i Ilāhī (Persian: دین الهی, lit. 'Divine Religion'), contemporarily called Tawḥīd-i-Ilāhī (توحید الهی, lit. 'Oneness of the Divine'), was a short-lived syncretic theology that was propounded by emperor Akbar of the Mughal Empire in 1582. According to Indian professor Iqtidar Alam Khan of Aligarh Muslim University, it was based on the concept of what was known to be "Yasa-e-Changezi" among the Timurids, with the goal of considering all sects and religions as one. Its core elements were drawn from combining aspects of Islam and other Abrahamic religions with those of several Indian religions and Zoroastrianism.

The religion manifested Akbar's worldview and policy, and received state backing until the end of his reign. However, many Muslim scholars of the period declared it to be blasphemy and decried Akbar as an apostate, with only a handful of upper-class Mughal subjects adopting the new religion. Following Akbar's death, Dīn-i Ilāhī was made defunct by Jahangir, who moved away from many of his father's policies in regard to religion. Akbar's great-grandson Aurangzeb completely abolished Din-i Ilahi and reimposed the Islamic law. Ultimately, the religion is thought not to have gained more than its 19 identified followers, and it lasted just over 20 years before Islam returned as the state religion.

== Name ==
The name Dīn-i Ilāhī literally translates to "God's Religion", "Religion of God", or "Divine Religion". According to historian Mubarak Ali, Dīn-i Ilāhī is not the name that was used for the religion in Akbar's time. At the time, it was called Tawhid-i-Ilāhī ("Oneness of the Divine"), as it is written by Abu'l-Fazl, a court historian during the reign of Akbar. This name suggests a particularly monotheistic focus for Akbar's faith. The anonymous Dabestan-e Mazaheb uses the name Ilahiyya to refer to the faith.

== History ==
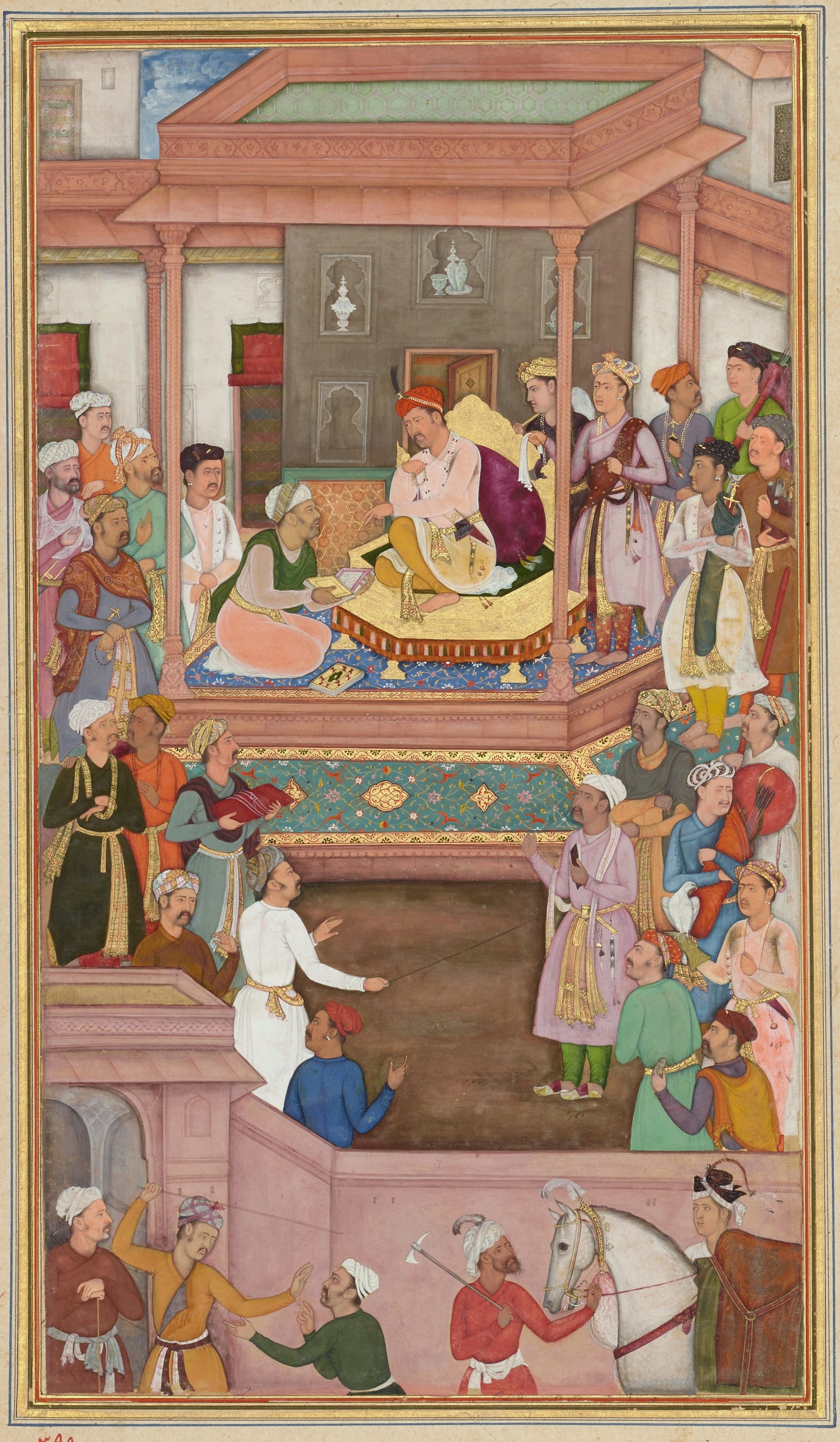
Abu'l-Fazl, one of the disciples of Din-i Ilahi, presenting Akbarnama to Akbar, Mughal miniature

Akbar promoted tolerance of other faiths and even encouraged debate on philosophical and religious issues. This led to the creation of the Ibādat Khāna ("House of Worship") at Fatehpur Sikri in 1575, which invited theologians, poets, scholars, and philosophers from all religious denominations, including Christians, Hindus, Jains, and Zoroastrians.

Despite extensive tutoring, Akbar was unable to read or write, perhaps due to dyslexia, and so he accessed knowledge through recitation and conversation, including exploring questions of faith through dialogues in the House of Worship. Despite his aforementioned illiteracy, Akbar would eventually amass a library full of more than 24,000 volumes of texts in Hindustani, Persian, Greek, Latin, Arabic and Kashmiri. The later Mughal Emperor and son of Akbar, Jahangir, stated that his father was "always associated with the learned of every creed and religion." In a letter to King Philip II of Spain, Akbar laments that so many people do not investigate their religious arguments, stating that most people will instead blindly "follow the religion in which [they] were born and educated, thus excluding [themselves] from the possibility of ascertaining the truth, which is the noblest aim of the human intellect."

By the time Akbar established the Dīn-i Ilāhī, he had already repealed the jizya (tax on non-Muslims) over a decade earlier in 1568. A religious experience while he was hunting in 1578 further increased his interest in the religious traditions of his empire. From the discussions held at the Ibādat Khāna, Akbar concluded that no single religion could claim the monopoly of truth. This revelation inspired him to leave Islam and create a new religion, Dīn-i Ilāhī, in 1582 and Akbar along with his loyal officials converted to this new religion Dīn-i Ilāhī in 1582.

This conversion of Akbar to Dīn-i Ilāhī angered various Muslims, among them the qadi of the Bengal Subah and Shaykh Ahmad Sirhindi, who responded by declaring it to be blasphemy to Islam.

Some modern scholars have argued that the Din-i Ilahi was a spiritual discipleship of Akbar of his own belief which he propounded in his new religion.

=== After Akbar ===
Dīn-i Ilāhī appears to have survived Akbar according to the Dabestān-e Mazāheb. However, the movement was suppressed by force after his death and was totally eradicated by Aurangzeb, a task made easier by the fact that the religion never had more than 19 adherents.

In the 17th century, an attempt to re-establish the Dīn-i Ilāhī was made by Shah Jahan's eldest son Dara Shikoh, but any prospects of an official revival were halted by his brother, Aurangzeb, who executed him on grounds of apostasy. Aurangzeb later compiled the Fatawa-e-Alamgiri, reimposed the jizya, and established Islamic law across the Indian subcontinent, spreading Islamic orthodoxy and extinguishing any chance of religious reform for generations.

== Beliefs and practices ==
Although the spirit and central principles of Dīn-i Ilāhī were adapted from Sufism (including ideas from the Andalusi Sufi mystic, Ibn al-'Arabi), Akbar endeavored to create a synthesis of other beliefs and so his personal religion borrowed concepts and tenets from many other faiths. Aligned with Sufi practices, one's soul is encouraged to purify itself through yearning of God. Virtues included generosity, forgiveness, abstinence, prudence, wisdom, kindness, and piety. The following details illustrate the personal religious observances of Akbar:

As an inquisitive inquirer endowed with the spirit of reason, he learnt the Hindu alchemy and medicine and cultivated their Yoga system; like his Central Asian ancestor, he believed in astronomy and astrology; and after his association with the Zoroastrian Mobed, he believed that life might be lengthened by lightning fire or by the repetition of a thousand names of Sun. Following the Buddhist custom, he used to shave the crown of his head thinking that the soul passed through the brain. He turned into a vegetarian later in life.

The visitation of Jesuit missionaries such as Rodolfo Acquaviva brought the virtue of celibacy into the House of Worship, where it consequently became a virtue of Akbar's faith that was not mandatory (as it is for the priests of Roman Catholicism) but respected. The faith also adopted the principle of ahimsa, an ancient virtue of almost all Indian religions, including Hinduism, Buddhism and Jainism. The nonviolence extended from humans to animals, encouraging vegetarianism and prohibiting the slaughter of animals for any reason at all. The Dīn-i Ilāhī had no sacred scriptures and, similar to both Islam and Sikhism, there was no priestly hierarchy.

Light was a focus of divine worship, with a light-fire ritual based on the yasna (the primary form of worship in Zoroastrianism) and an adoption of the hymn of the 1,000 Sanskrit names for the sun. Followers were referred to as chelah (meaning "disciples").

The major practices and beliefs of Dīn-i Ilāhī were as follows:

1. The unity of God
2. Followers salute one-another with Allah-u-Akbar (meaning: "God is Great") or Jalla Jalaluhu (meaning: "may His glory be glorified")
3. Absence of meat of all kinds
4. One's "on-birth-by-anniversary" party was a must for every member
5. Ahimsa (non-violence); followers were prohibited from dining with fishers, butchers, hunters, etc.

=== Ṣulḥ-i-kul ===
It has been argued that the theory of Dīn-i Ilāhī being a new religion was a misconception which arose because of erroneous translations of Abu'l-Fazl's work by later British historians. However, it is also accepted that the policy of sulh-i-kul, which formed the essence of Dīn-i Ilāhī, was adopted by Akbar as a part of general imperial administrative policy. Sulh-i-Kul means "universal peace". According to Abu'l-Fazl, the emperor was a universal agent of god, and so his sovereignty was not bound to any single faith. In this, Akbar appointed officials based on their ability and merit, regardless of their religion or background. This helped to create a more efficient government and contributed to the prosperity and cultural achievements of the Mughal period. The emperor is further prohibited from discriminating between the different religions of the realm and if the ruler did discriminate, then they were not fit for the role as an agent of god. Abu'l-Fazl saw the religious views of Akbar as a rational decision toward maintaining harmony between the various faiths of the empire.

== Disciples ==
The initiated disciples of Dīn-i Ilāhī during emperor Akbar's time included:

- Shaikh Mubarak
- Shaikh Faizi
- Jafar Beig
- Qasim Khan
- Abu'l-Fazl ibn Mubarak
- Azam Khan
- Abdus Samad
- Mulla Shah Muhammad Shahadad
- Sufi Ahmad
- Mir Sharif Amal
- Sultan Khwaja
- Mirza Jani Thatta
- Taki Shustar
- Shaikhzada Gosala Benarasi
- Sadar Jahan
- Sadar Jahan's first son
- Sadar Jahan's second son
- Birbal
- Prince Murad

== See also ==
- Allopanishad
- Sirr-i-Akbar
- Majma-ul-Bahrain
- Ganga-Jamuni tehzeeb
- Religious policy of the Mughals after Akbar
