= Jama Masjid, Fatehpur Sikri =

Mosque in Uttar Pradesh, India

Jama Mosque
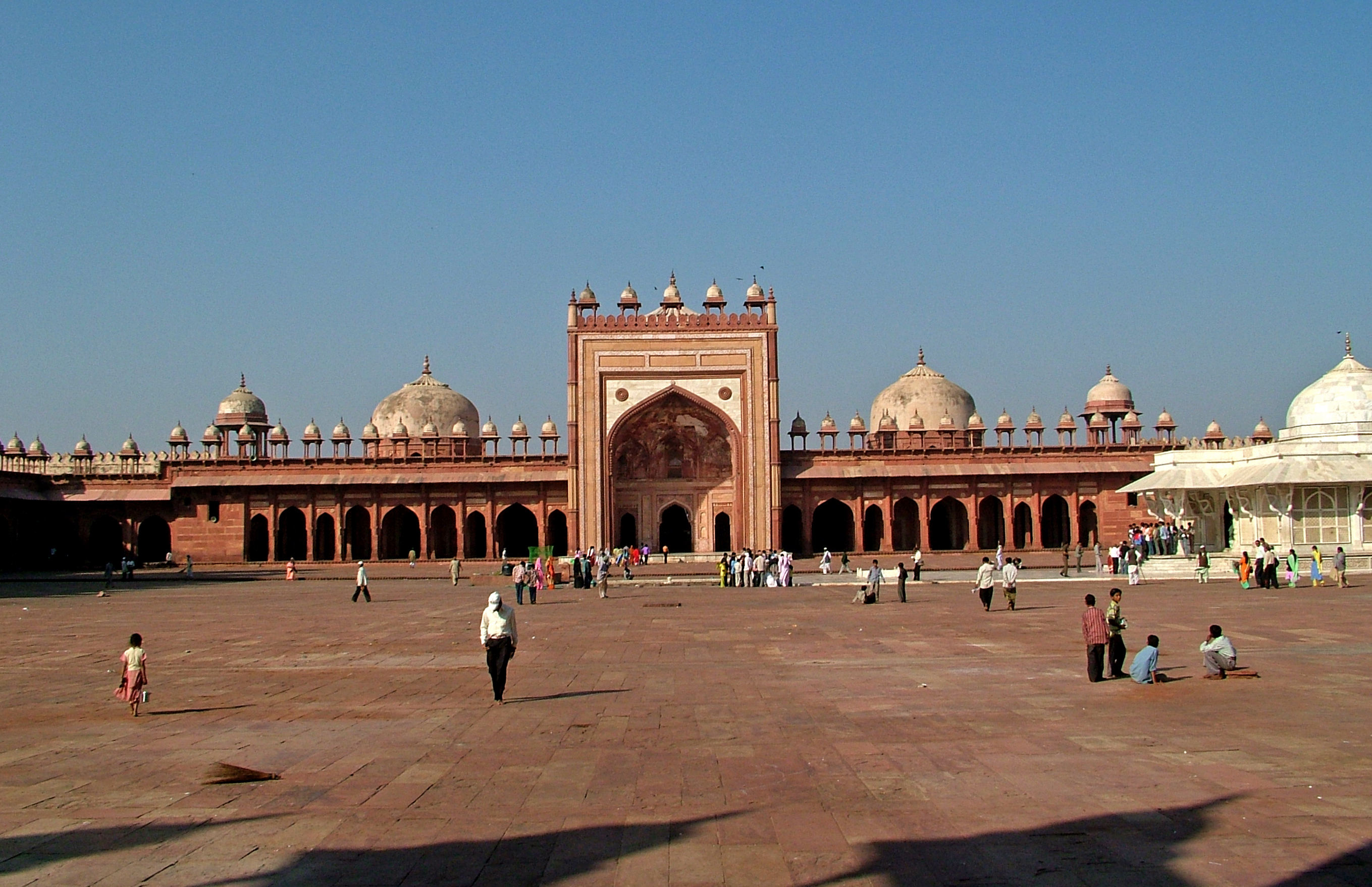
- The mosque in 2000

- Location of the mosque in Uttar Pradesh

Religion
- Affiliation: Sunni Islam
- Sect: Sufism (Chishti Order)
- Ecclesiastical or organisational status: Friday mosque and dargah
- Status: Active

Location
- Location: Fatehpur Sikri, Agra district, Uttar Pradesh
- Country: India
- Administration: Archaeological Survey of India
- Coordinates: 27°05′42″N 77°39′46″E

Architecture
- Type: Mosque architecture
- Style: Indo-Islamic; Mughal
- Founder: Akbar

Specifications
- Length: 165.2 m (542 ft)
- Width: 133.6 m (438 ft)
- Dome: Three
- Shrines: Several, including: Tomb of Salim Chishti; Tomb of Islam Khan; Other members of the Chishti family
- Materials: Red sandstone, marble, slate

Monument of National Importance
- Official name: Fatehpur Sikri: Jami Masjid (Dargah)
- Part of: Fatehpur Sikri
- Reference no.: N-UP-A45-aw

UNESCO World Heritage Site
- Official name: Fatehpur Sikri
- Criteria: Cultural: ii, iii, iv
- Reference: 255
- Inscription: 1986 (10th Session)
- Location of the mosque in Fatehpur Sikri

The Jama Mosque, also known as the Jama Masjid, is a 16th-century Sufi Friday mosque and dargah complex, in the UNESCO World Heritage Site of Fatehpur Sikri, located in the Agra district of the state of Uttar Pradesh, India. It was built by Mughal emperor Akbar, and was the largest mosque in the empire at the time of construction. The Jama Masjid's design drew from earlier mosques built by various pre-Mughal sultanates, and served as an important precedent in subsequent Mughal architecture.

The mosque, as part of Fatehpur Sikri, is a Monument of National Importance, administered by the Archaeological Survey of India. Notable other monuments in the mosque complex include the Buland Darwaza, which acts as the mosque's southern gate, and the Tomb of Salim Chishti, a saint in whose honour the mosque was constructed.

== History ==
Akbar commissioned the Jama Masjid as part of his new capital city of Fatehpur Sikri. The structure was one of the first sites constructed in the city, and was completed sometime between 1571 and 1574, according to its own inscriptions. The mosque was in honour of the Sufi Shaikh Salim Chishti, Akbar's spiritual advisor. It was also meant to serve as a khanqah (monastic school) for the Shaikh's descendants. In its time, it was extolled by various authors and travellers for its beauty and grandeur.

The mosque played a part in Akbar's religious designs. In 1579, he delivered the khutbah for a congregational prayer attended by the inhabitants of Fatehpur Sikri. While some of his ancestors had done this, the reading of the khutbah was typically reserved for religious leaders (such as an imam) and hence was perceived by the ulema as radical. Akbar also joined the population in their prayer, and was even seen sweeping the floors of the mosque. Kavuri-Bauer argues that all these actions were conscious moves on Akbar's part, using the mosque to portray himself as a divine sovereign rather than a regular ruler.

The Jama Masjid at Fatehpur Sikri remained a "symbol of Mughal heritage and pride" after Akbar's rule. The mosque was heavily admired by Akbar's son and successor Jahangir, who called it one of his father's greatest architectural achievements. Jahangir discussed the mosque complex at length with his son Khurram during a stay at Fatehpur Sikri in 1619. Khurram went on to become Mughal Emperor Shah Jahan, and cited this mosque as the model for his own Jama Masjid at Delhi.

== Architecture ==
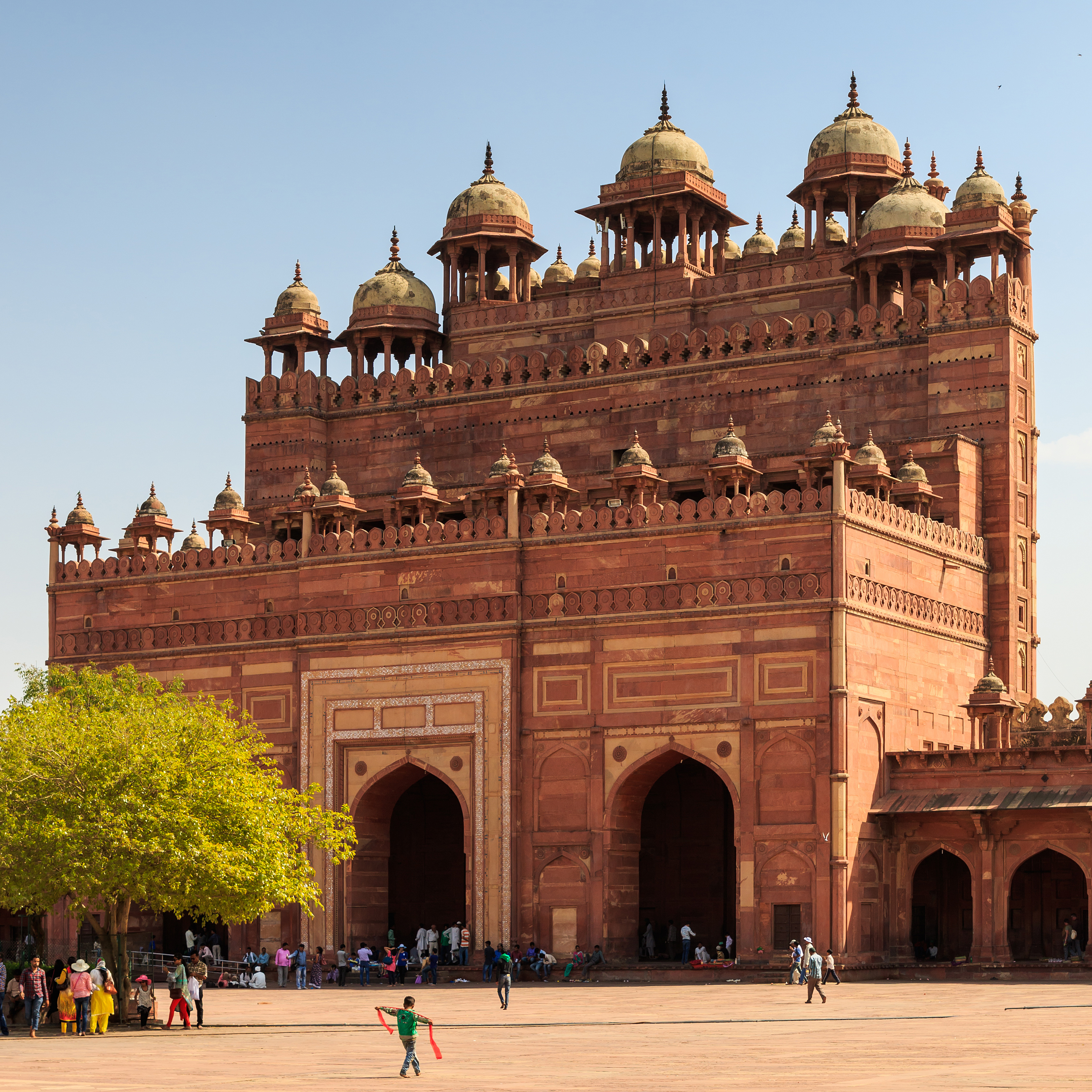
Buland Darwaza Jama Masjid

The Jama Masjid is situated on the highest point of the rocky ridge on which the Fatehpur Sikri site is located. It is placed on an elevated plinth, built in order to provide a level surface. The mosque complex is surrounded by enclosure walls; just outside the southern wall is a large baoli (octagonal step-well). Similar to the rest of Fatehpur Sikri, the mosque is made of locally-quarried red sandstone. It also employs yellow sandstone, marble, and slate for decoration, and features Persian and Arabic calligraphy.

At the time of its construction, the mosque was the largest in Mughal India. It represents a fusion of Islamic, Hindu, and Jain architecture, with a marked Gujarati influence. Catherine Asher asserts that the mosque draws elements from the Jama Masjid at Mandu, and the Jama Masjid at Chanderi, both pre-Mughal structures. Alfieri also sees an inspiration from pre-Mughal Jama Masjids, but instead cites those at Atala and Champaner.

=== Gates ===
The mosque complex is entered via three gates. The eastern gate, known as the Badshahi Darwaza (Imperial Gate), was used by Akbar to access the mosque. It is decorated using cut mosaics. The northern and southern gates may have historically resembled each other - however, in 1573 the southern gate was rebuilt by Akbar as the Buland Darwaza (High Gate) to celebrate the success of his military campaign in Gujarat. It is the most prominent gate and a monument in itself, featuring hallways and rooms over its many floors. Asher says that it is more likely the gate was built to emphasise Akbar's relationship with the Chishti Order.

=== Courtyard ===
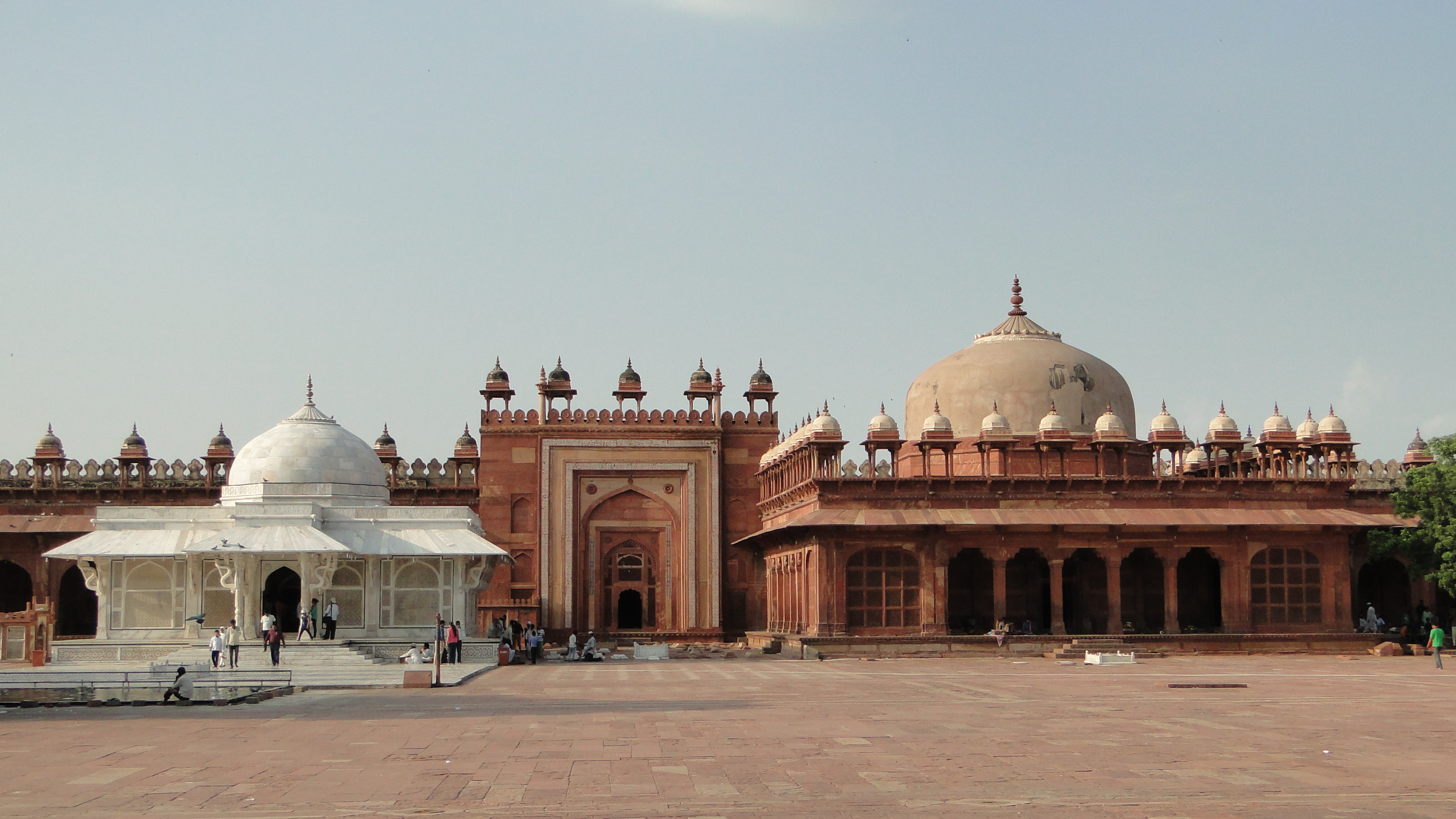
View from within the courtyard of the Salim Chisti mausoleum (left) and Tomb of Islam Khan (right)

The sahn (courtyard) measures 165 by 130 metres (541 by 427 ft). An ablution tank lies in its centre. The courtyard's northern, southern, and eastern sides are lined by dalans (arcades). These are shaded by a continuous, projecting chhajja (eave), which is supported by corbels. Chhatris top the parapets of these arcades. The inner bay of the arcades is divided into hujra (cells), probably used as sleeping quarters for devotees.

Towards the northern side of the courtyard are the Tomb of Salim Chishti, the tomb of Islam Khan, and those of several other members of the Chishti family. Salim Chishti's mausoleum is contrasted from the red sandstone of the Jama Masjid complex by its wholesale use of makrana marble. Underground water reservoirs lie beneath the courtyard.

=== Prayer Hall ===
The rectangular prayer hall (dimensions 89 m by 20 m) lies on the western end of the courtyard, facing Mecca in keeping with Islamic tradition. Its facade is dominated by a grand pishtaq, which contains three arched entryways. Three domes rise from the roof, corresponding to the three bays into which the hall is divided. The central bay is square and richly decorated, featuring geometric marble inlays as well as polychrome floral paintings. Its western wall bears ornate mihrabs (prayer niches), bordered by mosaics and glazed tile. The two side bays are colonnaded halls, each containing a square chamber. These halls contain their own decorated mihrabs, and are supported by Hindu-style pillars. At the extremities of the prayer hall are zenanas (women's galleries).

== See also ==
- Sufism in India
- List of mosques in India
- List of Monuments of National Importance in Agra district
