= Buland Darwaza =

Historical building in India

Coordinates: 27°05′40″N 77°39′46″E

Buland Darwaza (lit. 'Exalted Gate'), or the "Door of victory", is a gateway whose construction was started in 1573 by Mughal emperor Akbar to commemorate his victory over Gujarat. It is the main entrance to the Jama Masjid at Fatehpur Sikri, which is 43 km from Agra, India.

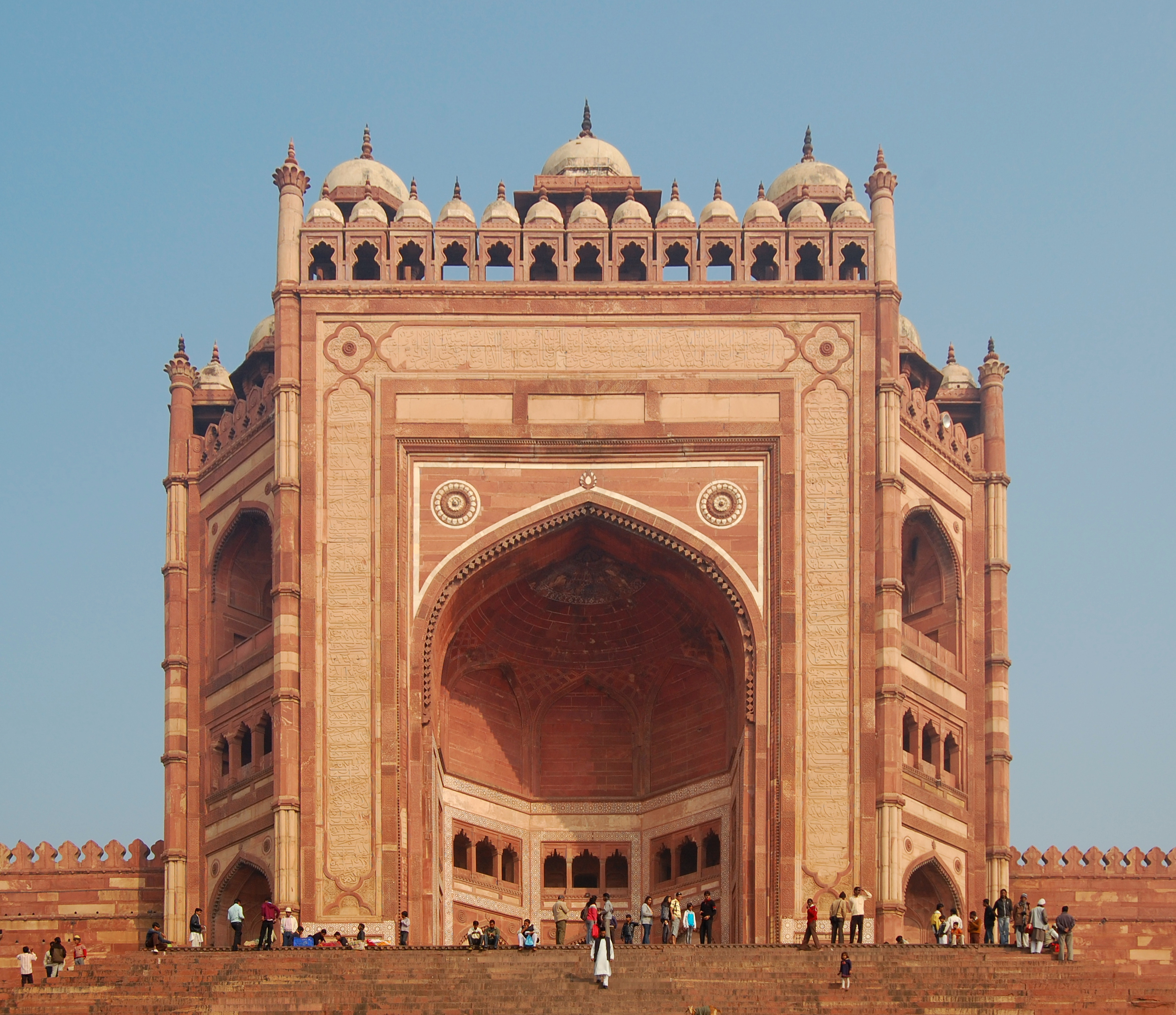
Front view of the Buland Darwaza

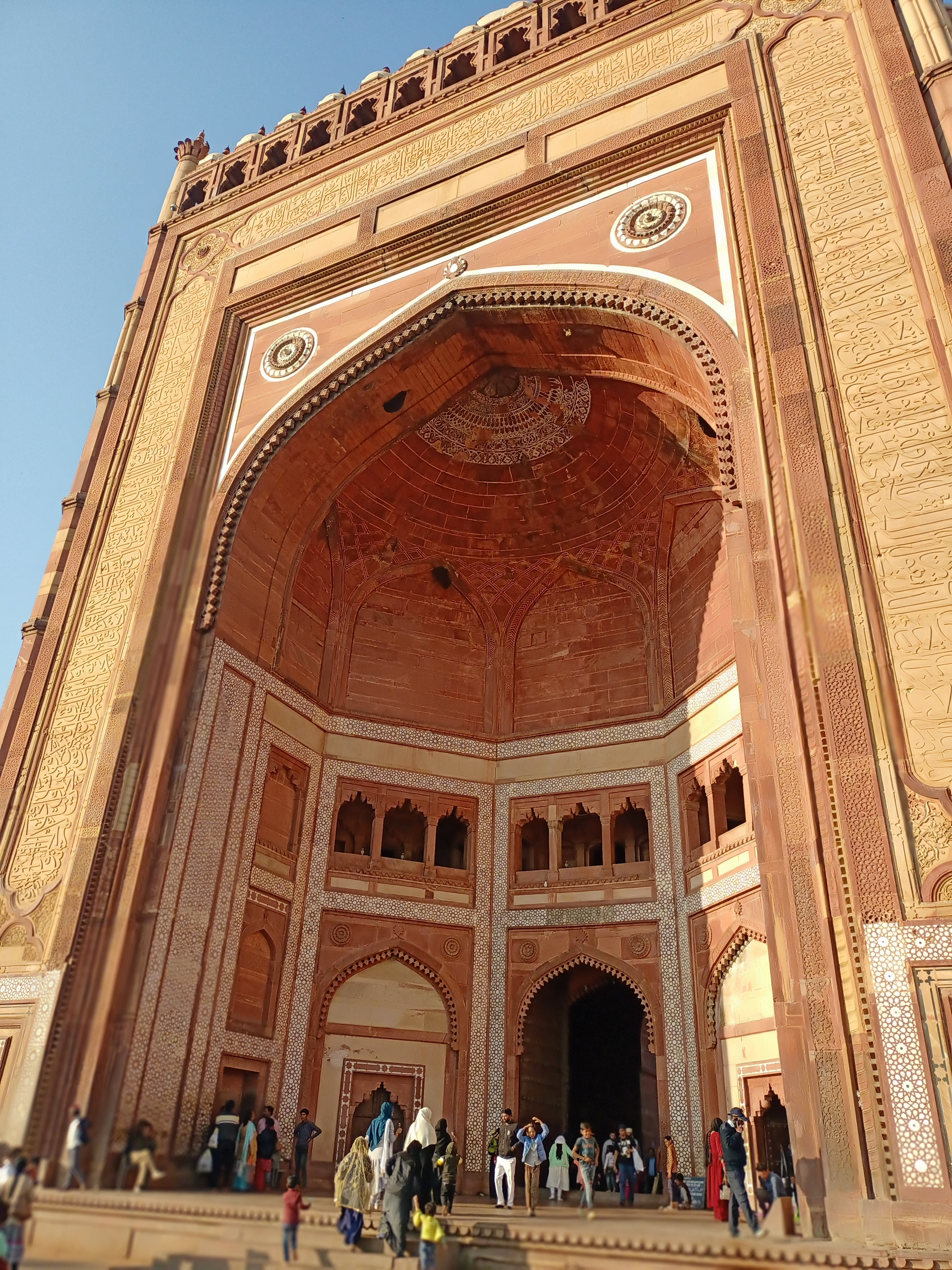
Side view of Buland Darwaza, Fatehpur Sikri

An example of Mughal architecture, the Buland Darwaza is often described as one of the highest gateways in the world. It displays sophistication and heights of technology in Akbar's empire.

== Architecture ==
The Buland Darwaza is made of red and buff sandstone, and is higher than the courtyard of the mosque. The Buland Darwaza is symmetrical and is topped by large free-standing kiosks, which are the chhatris. It also has terrace edge gallery kiosks on the roof, stylised buckler-battlements, small minor-spires, and inlay work with white and black marble. On the outside, a long flight of steps sweeps down the hill giving the gateway additional height. It is 40 metres high and 51 metres from the ground. The total height of the structure is about 54 metres from the ground level. It is a fifteen-storey gateway forming the southern entrance to the city of Fatehpur Sikri. The approach to the gate consists of 42 steps. It is semi-octagonal in plan with two smaller triple-storeyed wings on either side, it has three kiosks on its top surrounded by thirteen smaller domed kiosks. There are smaller turrets surrounding the gateway. The expanse is broken by arched niches, small laudas, and marbles which highlights the courtyard of the jama masjid (congregational mosque). The principal arch stands in the centre of three projecting sides and topped by a dome. The central arch is broken into three tiers with rows of smaller arches and flat brackets.

The great gate itself is plain. The three horizontal panels of buff stone noticeable in the Badshahi Darwaza are also present here. The plain red sandstone spandrels are framed in white marble with a flower-like ornament inlaid in white marble at the apex of the arch, and a flattish rosette, centered with the narrow panel above it, on either side. The cusped ornament, large and bold in fact, but small and delicate when seen from below, is carried down below the springing of the arch. Two pieces have been broken off from the left hand side and eight from the right. The arch has three actual openings bordered by decorative panels and superimposed by three other arched openings crowned by a semi-dome. The total height of the Gate above the pavement is 176 ft.

A Persian inscription on the eastern archway of the Buland Darwaza records Akbar's conquest of Uttar Pradesh and the victory in Gujarat in 1573.

== Inscription ==
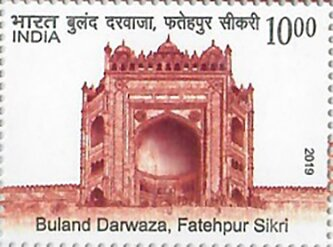
Stamp of India, 2019, depicting the Buland Darwaza at Fatehpur Sikri from the "Historic Gates of Indian Forts and Monuments" series.

On the main gateway, an Islamic inscription written in Persian reads "Isa" (Jesus), son of Maryam (Mary) said: "The world is a Bridge, pass over it, but build no houses upon it. He who hopes for a day may hope for eternity, but the World endures but an hour. Spend it in prayer for the rest is unseen."

Isa was advising his followers not to consider the world as a permanent home and hope for worldly things, as human life is of short duration.

Verses from the Quran have been carved in the Naskh (script) along the top. These were drawn by Khwaja Hussain Chishti, a disciple of Sheikh Salim Chishti.

== Purpose ==
Buland Darwaza was not a part of the original design of the jama masjid (congregational mosque), it was erected by Akbar to celebrate his conquest of Gujarat in 1573.

== See also ==
- Taj Mahal
- Tomb of Salim Chishti
- Ibadat Khana
- Jodha Bai Mahal
- Naubat Khana
- Humayun's Tomb
