= Anup Talao =

Pavilion and pool in Uttar Pradesh, India

Coordinates: 27°05′49″N 77°39′58″E

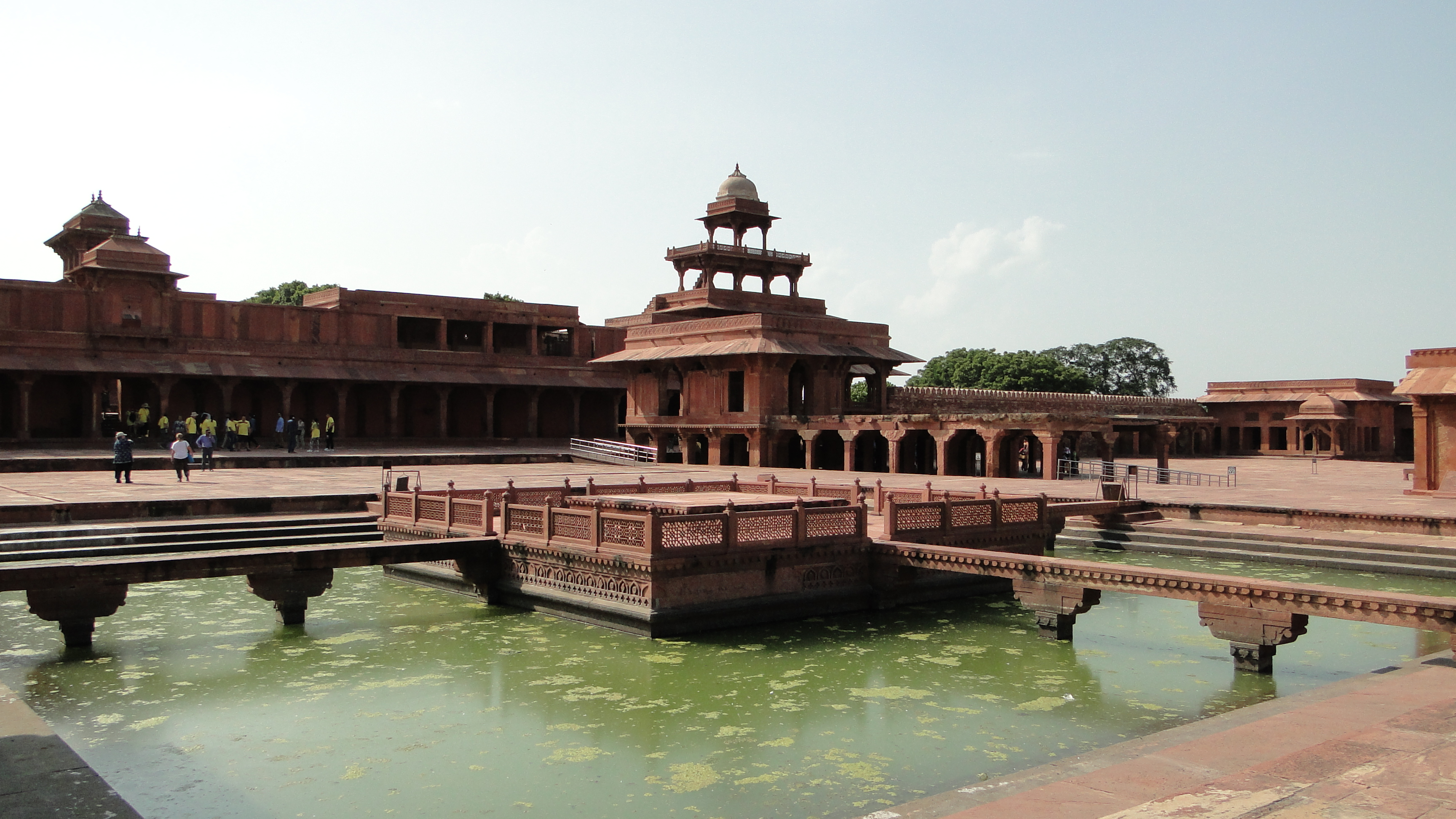
Anup Talao Central platforms and pathways. Fatehpur Sikri, India

The Anup Talao is a pavilion completed in 1576. It is set in the centre of a pool in the courtyard of the Fatehpur Sikri Fort in Fatehpur Sikri, Uttar Pradesh, India. The pavilion is also known as "Char-Chamad", referring to the four bridges. Located north of the imperial apartments in the Mahal-i Khass courtyard (Khwabgah) and Northeast of Hujra-i-Anup Tala-u a pavilion that housed Akbar’s guests.

== History and structure ==
Created in the Mughal period, under the orders of Emperor Akbar, the "peerless pool" was created to help cool the local courtyard and provide an entertainment venue for the emperor. The red sandstone masonry tank is symmetrically separated in a square bilateral plan. Featuring a center platform between four stone bridges, the platform once housed a chair covered by a pavilion. This platform was also used as a stage for performers. The stone bridges are supported by columns with beautiful relief carvings at the top exposed to the surface of the water. In 1578 the Anup Talao was ordered to be filled with copper, silver, and gold coins, all of which would be distributed by Akbar to his community later.

The tanks are surrounded by a perimeter of stairs which can be a reference to the water levels over the history of the structure. The tank water levels have fluctuated due to new canal drains being added and blocked throughout time. The original water level was .96 meters to the sixth step of the stairway. In the twentieth century, Lord Curzon had to have debris and dirt cleaned from the drainage canals after the water level reached the twelfth stair (twice the original level) and drownings were becoming an issue.
