= Fatehpur Sikri railway station =

Railway station in Uttar Pradesh, India

General information
- Location: Fatehpur Sikri, Uttar Pradesh; India
- Coordinates: 27.0941°N 77.6707°E
- Elevation: 179 metres (587 ft)
- System: Indian Railways station
- Owner: Indian Railways
- Operator: North Central Railway
- Platforms: 2
- Tracks: 4 (single electrified broad gauge)
- Connections: Auto stand

Construction
- Structure type: Standard (on ground station)
- Parking: No
- Cycle facilities: No

Other information
- Status: Functioning
- Station code: FTS
- Zone(s): North Central Railway
- Division(s): Agra
Location
- Location within India Location within Uttar Pradesh

Fatehpur Sikri railway station is a small railway station in Agra district, Uttar Pradesh. Its code is FTS. It serves Fatehpur Sikri city. The station consists of two platforms. The platforms are not well sheltered. It lacks many facilities including water and sanitation.

== Trains ==
Some of the trains that run through Fatehpur Sikri are:

- Haldighati Passenger
- Avadh Express
- Agra Fort–Kota Passenger
- Bayana–Yamuna Bridge Agra Passenger
- Agra Cantt–Bayana MEMU
