= Panch Mahal, Fatehpur Sikri =

Palace in Uttar Pradesh, India

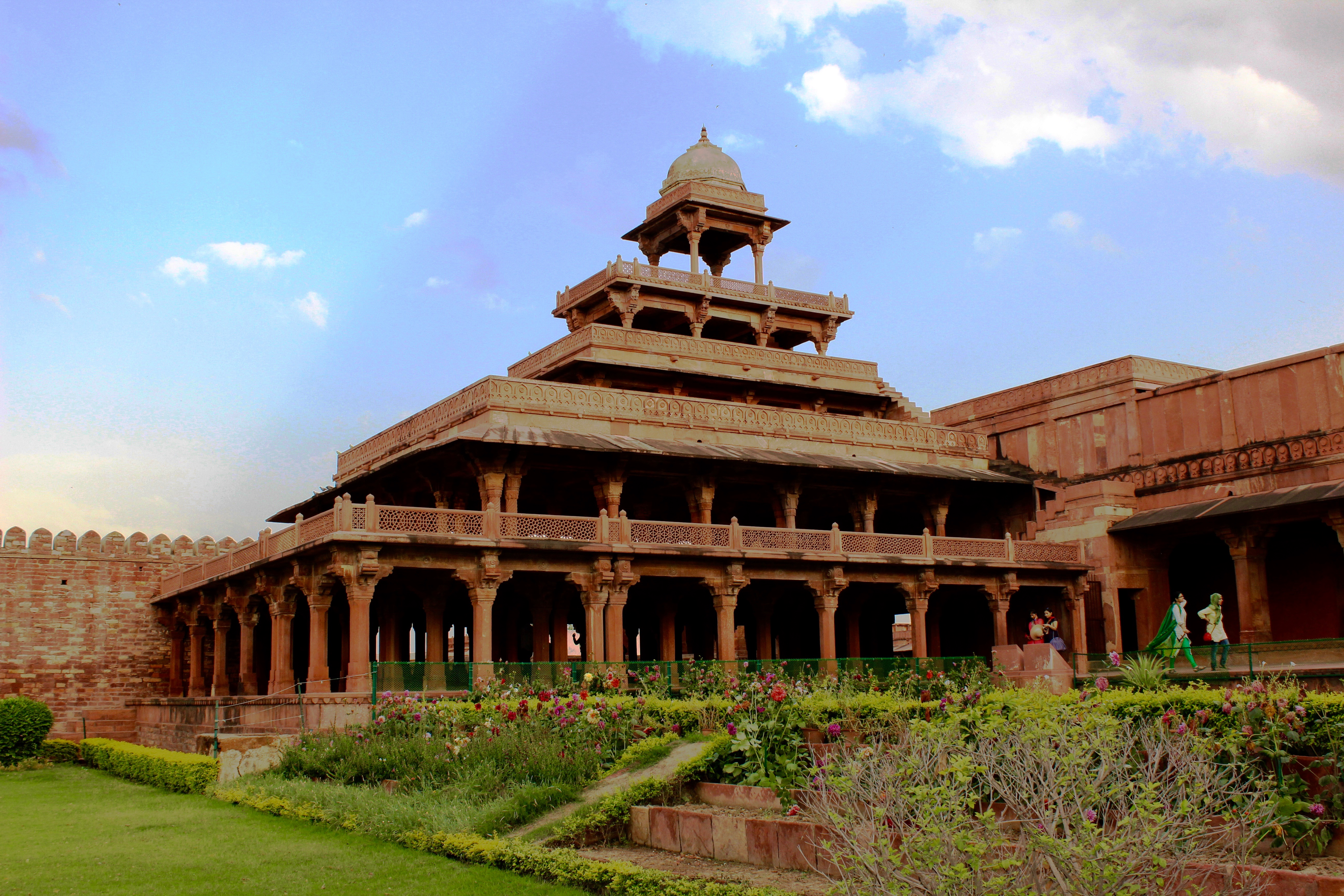
Panch Mahal, Fatehpur Sikri

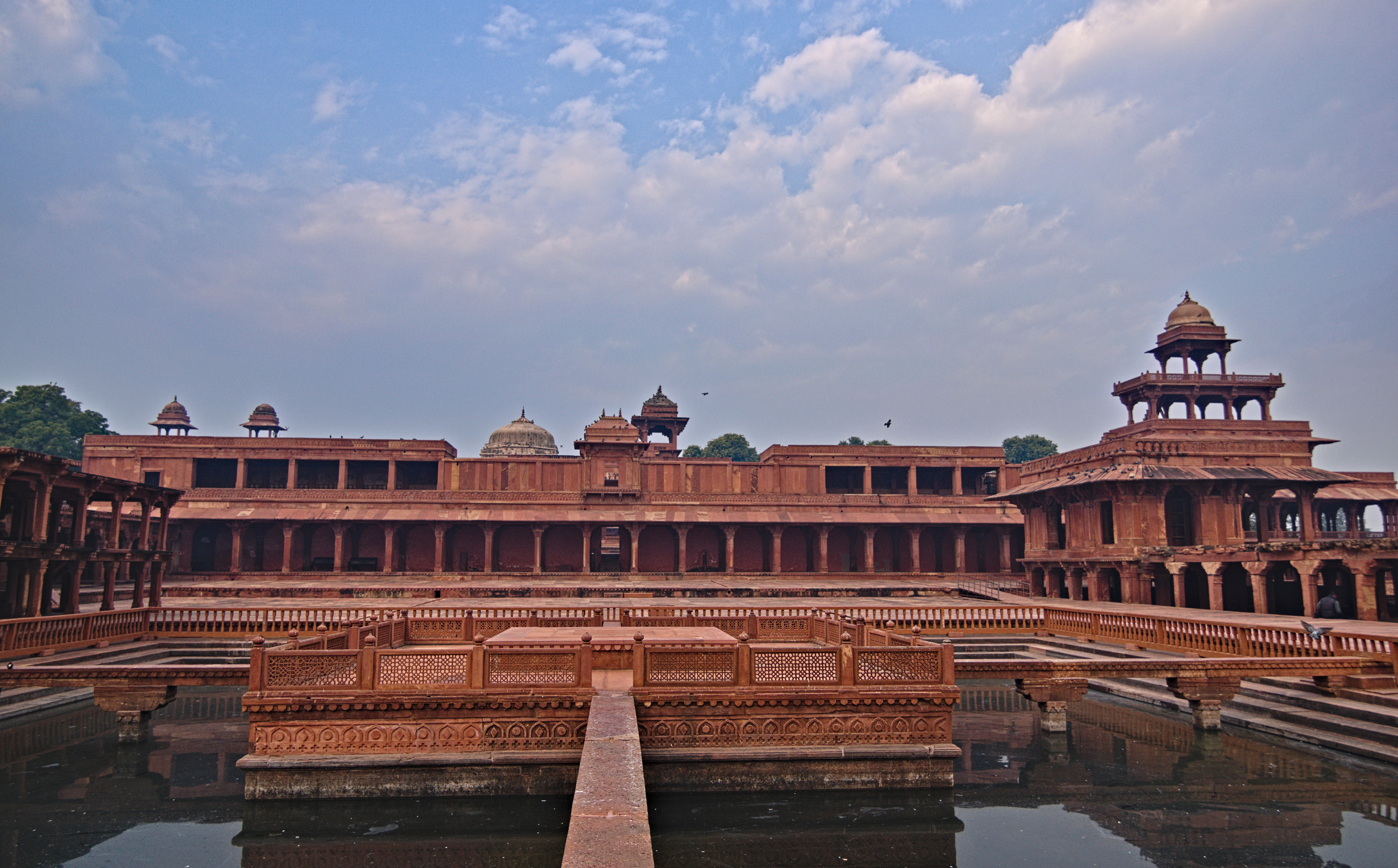
Another view

Panch Mahal is a palace in Fatehpur Sikri, Uttar Pradesh, India.

The Panch Mahal meaning 'Five level Palace' was commissioned by Akbar. This structure stands close to the Zenana quarters (Harem) which supports the supposition that it was used for entertainment and relaxation. This is one of the most important buildings in Fatehpur Sikri. This is an extraordinary structure employing the design elements of a Buddhist Temple; entirely columnar, consisting of four stories of decreasing size arranged asymmetrically on the ground floor, which contains 84 columns. These columns, that originally had jaali (screens) between them, support the whole structure. Once these screens provided purdah (cover) to queens and princess on the top terraces enjoying the cool breeze and watching splendid views of Sikri fortifications and the town nestling at the foot of the ridge.

The pavilion gives a majestic view of the fort that lies on its left. The pool in front of the Panch Mahal is called the Anoop Talab. It would have been filled with water, save for the bridge, and would have been the setting for musical concerts and other entertainment. The ground floor has 84 columns, the first story has 56 columns and the second and third stories have 20 and 12 columns respectively. The topmost story has 4 columns supporting a chhattri. There are 176 columns in all and each is elegantly carved pillars with unique designs.
