= Mughal conquest of Gujarat =

1572–1573 Mughal military campaign

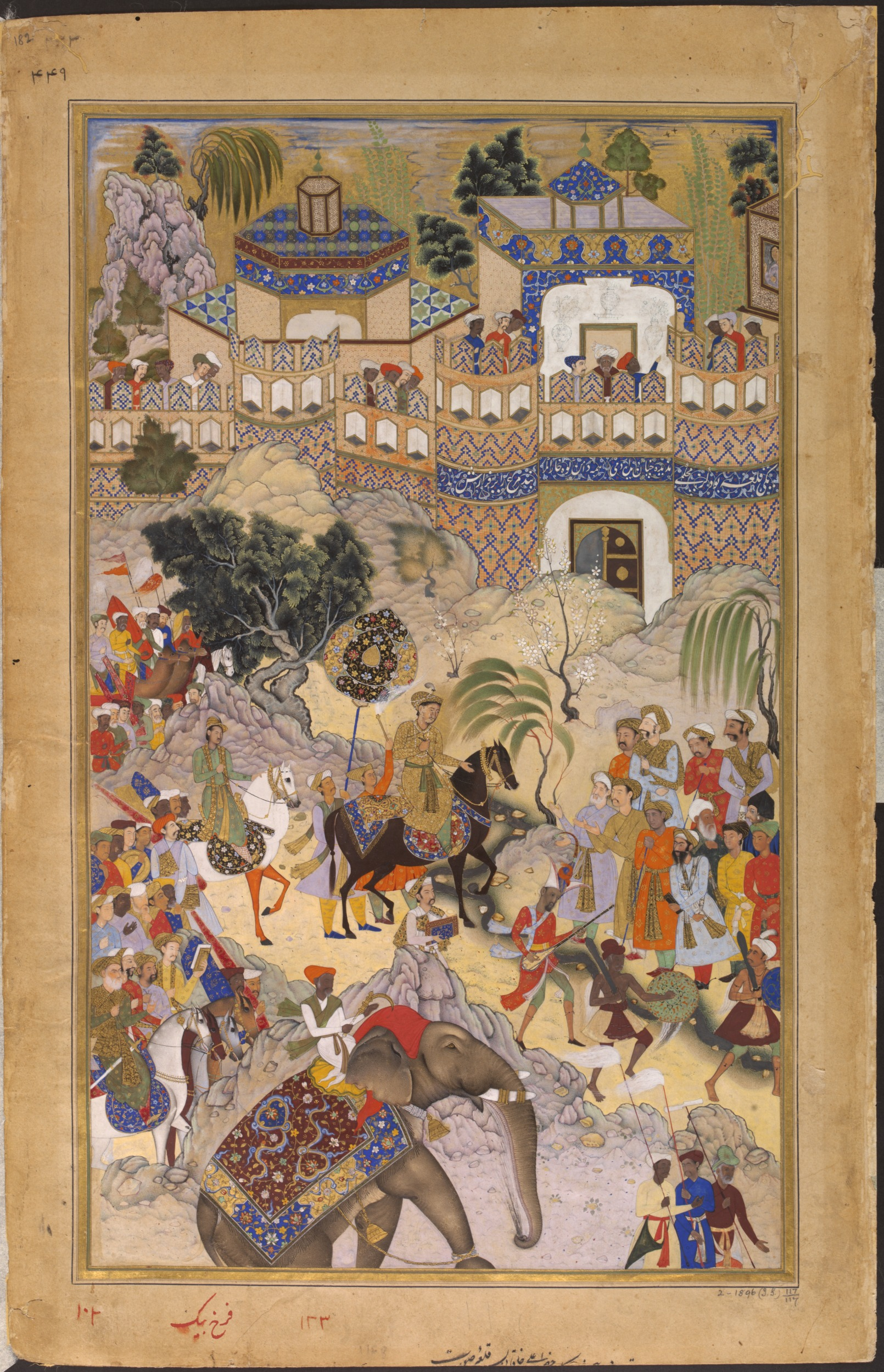
- Akbar's triumphal entry into Surat, 1572, Akbarnama.
Date	Early July 1572 – 3 August 1573
Location	Gujarat Sultanate
Result	Mughal victory
Territorial changes	Annexation of Gujarat Sultanate and establishment of Gujarat Subah

Belligerents
Mughal Empire; Kingdom of Amber	Gujarat Sultanate

Commanders and leaders
Akbar; Man Singh	Muzaffar Shah III

The last two Gujarat Sultans, Ahmad Shah III and Mahmud Shah III, were raised to throne when they were young so the nobles were ruling the Sultanate. The nobles divided territories between themselves but soon started fighting between themselves for supremacy. One noble invited the Mughal emperor Akbar to intervene in 1572 which resulted in the conquest of Gujarat by 1573 and Gujarat becoming the province of the Mughal Empire.

== Background ==
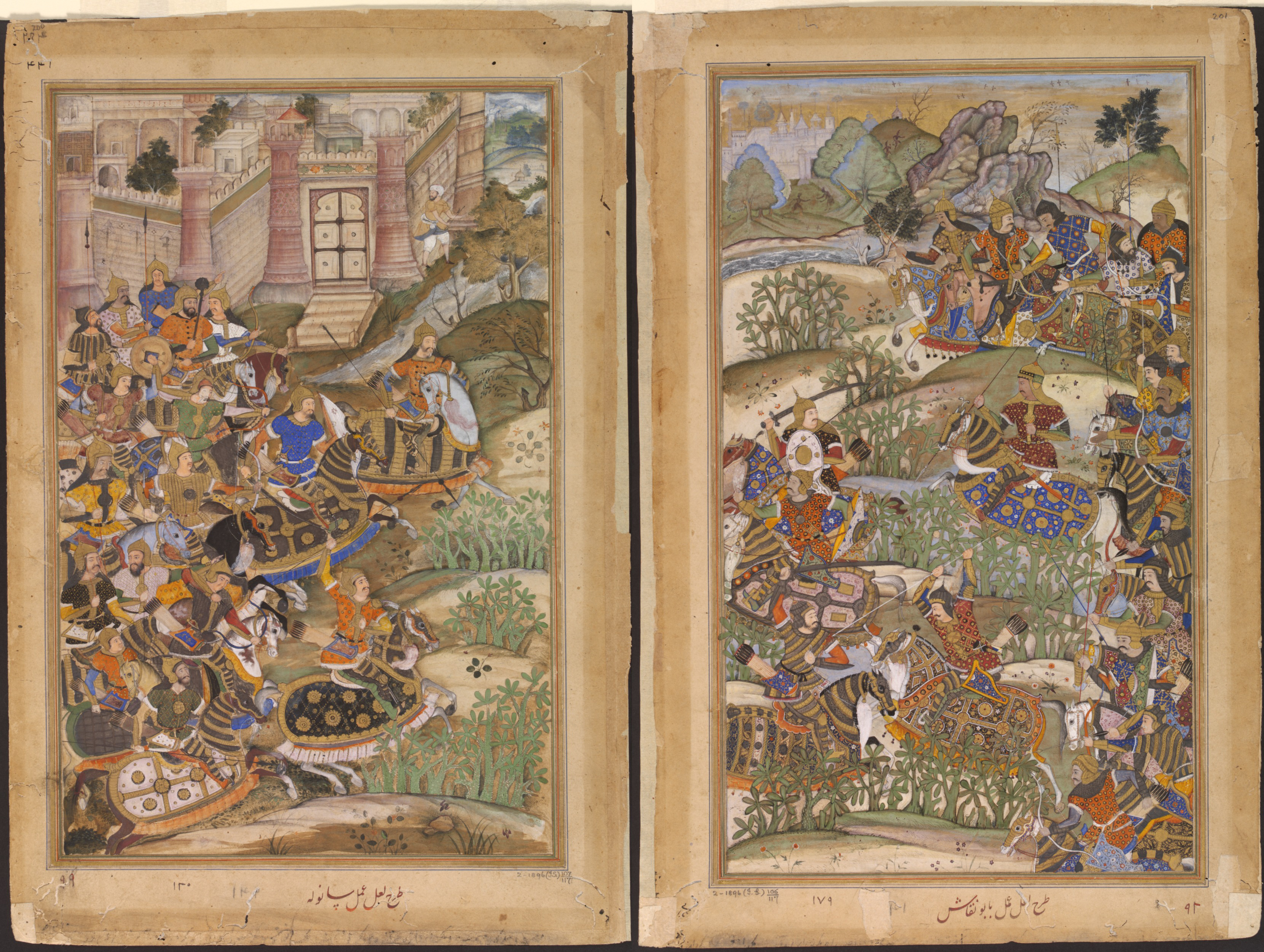
The Battle of Sarnal, 1572, Akbarnama

After establishing his supremacy in northern India, Akbar turned his attention toward extending his realm to the coastal regions. With Malwa secured and Rajasthan subdued, the path to Gujarat was now open. At that time, Gujarat was in a state of disorder under the weak rule of Muzaffar Shah III, a mere figurehead whose ambitious nobles had carved the kingdom into feuding parts. The region’s rich soil, busy ports, and lucrative foreign trade made it highly attractive, while its location along the pilgrimage route to Mecca and Medina added significant strategic value. Additionally, Gujarat’s proximity to Portuguese territories made its security vital to prevent potential foreign interference.

== Conquest of Gujarat ==
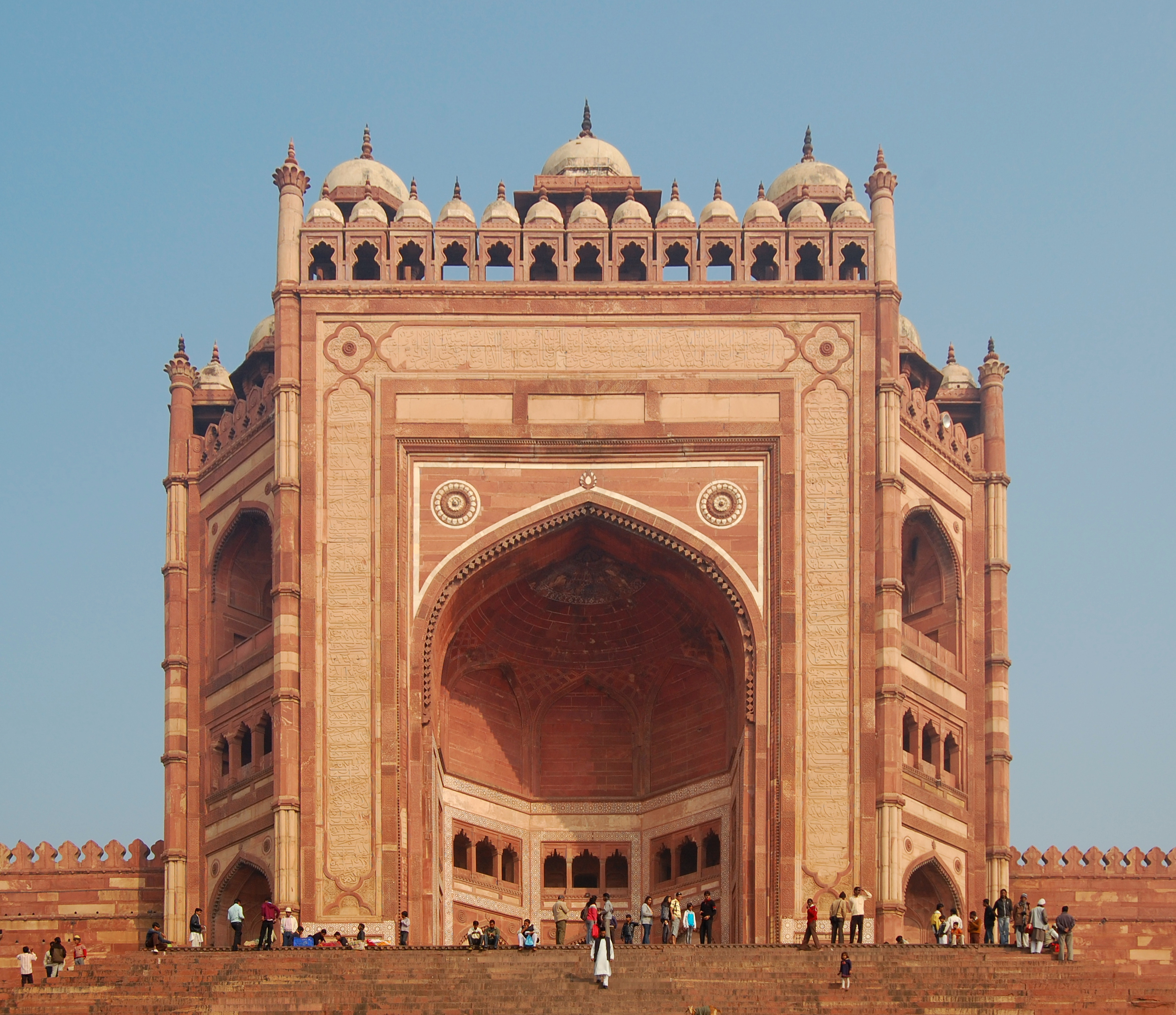
Buland Darwaza at Fatehpur Sikri was built by Akbar in 1575 to commemorate his victory over Gujarat

On 2 July 1572, Akbar departed from Fatehpur Sikri for Ajmer, sending ahead an advance guard of 10,000 cavalry under Khan Kalan. His march took him through Nagaur and Merta until he reached Sirohi, where he launched a counterattack on the Rajputs after they had ambushed his advance guard, resulting in the death of 150 enemy warriors. Following this engagement, he continued toward Patan, dispatching Raja Man Singh to pursue the sons of Sher Khan Fuladi near Idar.

In December, Akbar left Ahmedabad for the prosperous port of Cambay, where he first saw the sea and interacted with merchants from Portugal, Turkey, Syria, Persia, and Transoxiana.

Not long after, local noblemen, including Itimad Khan, came to pay their respects to Akbar. In November, he arrived in the capital of Gujarat and began reorganizing the territory. He divided the region, assigning the area northwest of the Mahi River to Khan Azam and handing over the southern part—where rebellious Mlrzas had taken hold—to Itimad Khan.

Turning his focus to regional powers, Akbar addressed challenges from the Mirzas, who controlled significant parts of Gujarat—namely, Ibrahim Husain in Baroda, Muhammad Husain in Surat, and Shah Mirza in Champaner. After arriving at Baroda, he dispatched an army under Shiahbaz Khan toward Champaner and sent a larger force led by Sayyid Mahmud Khan Barha to Surat. Akbar himself moved to intercept Ibrahim Husain, who was advancing from the north. With only 200 men at his disposal, he risked a daring nighttime crossing of the Mahi River and engaged in fierce, close-quarters combat that resembled a tournament. Despite nearly losing his life when two enemy troopers attacked him, Akbar managed to defeat Ibrahim Husain, who later escaped under cover of darkness.

Next, Akbar set his sights on Surat. After approximately six weeks of resistance, the fort’s commandant surrendered on 26 February 1573. During the siege, Ibrahim Husain’s wife and his young son fled to the Deccan. Although the Portuguese—invited by the Mirzas—arrived in response, they found themselves too weak to engage Akbar and instead paid him a respectful visit. At the same time, Muhammad Husain Mirza and Shah Mirza, in alliance with Sher Khan Fuladi, laid siege to Patan. Khan A‘zam, along with local lords from Malwa and Chanderl, moved to relieve the Mughal commander Sayyid Ahmad Barha, inflicting a heavy defeat on the besiegers on 22 January 1573. Consequently, Sher Khan Fuladi retreated to Junagarh, while the Mirzas withdrew to the Deccan.

== Aftermath ==
In April, Akbar returned to Ahmedabad, transferring the administration of Gujarat to Khan Azam and that of Malwa to Muzaffar Khan Turbati before heading for his capital. Along the way, he received news from Sirohi that the notorious rebel Ibrahim Husain, who had been causing disturbances in Punjab after leaving Gujarat, had been defeated by the Mughal governor Husain Qull Khan. This governor had also negotiated peace with the local ruler Bidai Chand, contingent on recognizing Akbar’s authority. In June, Akbar reached Fatehpur Sikri, where he was presented with the head of Ibrahim Husain. His brother Masud, whose eyes had been sewn shut as punishment, was captured but later pardoned by the emperor.
