= Eastern esotericism =

Esoteric beliefs in the Eastern world

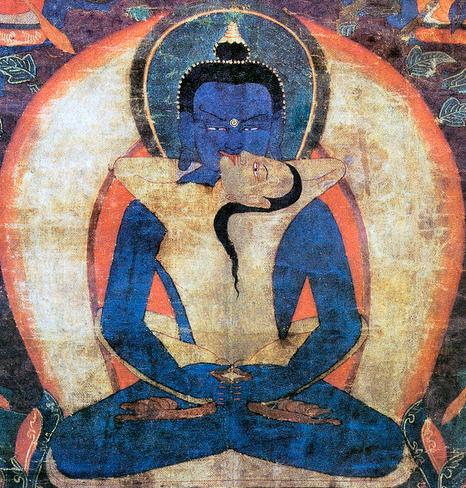
Yab-Yum of Samantabhadra ("All Good," the Primordial Buddha) and his female aspect of consort, Samantabhadrī (17th century). The erotic union symbolizes, respectively, the non-duality of Compassion (or Method) and Wisdom; or also of Form and Emptiness.

Eastern esotericism is a term used by some scholars that loosely encompasses religious beliefs and practices of the Eastern world said to be "esoteric", secret, or occult. Its demarcation as a field, however, is difficult, as it varies depending on the boundaries of geographical and cultural notions of Western and Eastern (such as concerning Islamic nations) and the definition of esotericism, with some scholars arguing it cannot be a concept beyond Western esotericism (which may raise questions about an unsuitable non-emic classification), while others propose a globalizing perspective. Still, it has been employed by scholars who recognize the category, used to denote comparable secret studies and practices, mainly in traditions of Hinduism and Buddhism, and also in other systems, ethnic religions, and syncretisms.

== Concept demarcation ==
Marco Pasi points out that the Western concept of esotericism emerged not in an academic context, but due to religionism in the 19th century, when the controversial distinction between Eastern and Western esotericism was first made. Initially, this dichotomy emerged in the 1880s: according to Julian Strube, French occultists accepted the authenticity of what they called "l'ésotérisme occidental" ("western esotericism") while rejecting the "false Eastern esotericism" of the Theosophical Society. There was also in 1890 a conflict within the Theosophical Society itself between William Quan Judge, who advocated for Western occultism, and Annie Besant, who advocated for the Eastern variant. According to Pasi: "It is therefore primarily as a reaction to an idea of "Eastern esotericism" that the idea of "Western esotericism" could develop." However, according to Strube, this is not enough to define these signifiers, as a complex network of exchanges occurred between various Eastern and Western cultures, and borders changed historically, politically, and ideologically. Therefore he defends the conceptualization of global esotericism. Different understandings of esotericism were produced globally, mainly through exchanges throughout the 19th century. Thus, scholars of religion often use the term "esoteric" to categorize practices that reserve "certain kinds of salvific knowledge for a selected elite of initiated disciples," according to Wouter Hanegraaff's description.

Depending on the definitions, most Western esotericism could be considered Eastern. Western esotericism has been deeply influenced by non-Western traditions, and vice versa, especially in contemporary times. This categorization into two hemispheres was of more internal importance to the rhetoric of esoteric movements than to academic discourse.

For example, in Neoplatonism, and then again from the Renaissance on, an exoticism was associated with the origin of the major teachings, as of the origin of Platonic philosophy in Ancient Egypt or of ancient knowledge to the "Chaldaic mysteries," the mystical and occult representing "Eastern wisdom". Thus, Iamblichus, for example, referred to the Chaldean Oracles as transmitting "ancient Assyrian doctrines," and Plethon attributed their origin to Zoroaster. Such a concept in the Western imagination has been called "Platonic Orientalism" by scholars.

The perspective can also vary according to the occultists' agenda, one example being Italian neo-pagan esoteric movements in the 20th century that, inspired by the "traditionalist Roman school", considered Christianity a "degeneration from the East" that would have nothing in common with the Western esoteric tradition, which they considered paganism. The esoteric "rhetoric of a hidden truth" also hinged on the exotic, forming in the imagination a "mystical East," and when Egypt ceased to be attractive in its exoticism, the pole of the "mystical East" shifted to India and beyond, as the "true abode of ancient wisdom."

Academically, it has come to be considered in some more recent studies of esotericism, such as those of Gordan Djurdjevic and Henrik Bogdan, that there are close equivalents of Western esotericism in Asian cultures, suggesting an Indian, Chinese, or Far Eastern "esotericism" in general. A large part of esotericism scholars argues that it is preferable to analyze it in a transcultural and globalized way, according to each nationality or cultural region, focusing on the interactions of the concept in a more specific local or cross-cultural way beyond "Western" and "Eastern", or also relatively and openly. With this, the differences of each system are taken into account, despite some similarities in matters of the occult and the possibility of a secrecy system, as in secret knowledge, elitism, theories about spirit and matter, a supposed universal knowledge, and hierarchical rites of passage.

Henrik Bodgan and Gordan Djurdjevic consider "Eastern esotericism" to be present alongside Western elements of Aleister Crowley's magick system, and Djurdjevic recognizes the spread of the study of Eastern esotericism as an important legacy of Crowley. Jeffrey J. Kripal uses the term "Asian esotericism" in his study of Tantra, and Olga Saraogi advocates the possibility of an "asiacentric" analysis of esotericism. Georgiana Hedesan and Tim Hudbøg consider that "Western" and "Eastern" can be used as relative designations, but that they are limiting, with specific localities such as European, Indian, and African being preferred.

Others, like Helmut Zander, say that it is not because there is a well-defined technical concept of "Western esotericism" that there must exist an "Eastern esotericism", "Northern esotericism", or "Southern esotericism". There are proposals for a category open to "global esotericism" or "open esotericism," considering that rigid definitions of esotericism do not apply to all cultures and at all times. Thus, Zander writes, for example, as Jan Assmann theorizes, that it is part of the history of Western religion since antiquity; a tension that is reflected in the semantics of public versus private, open versus secret; but proposes that defining "secret" as a possibility rather than a requirement may allow consideration of esotericism in other non-Western traditions. It is not because a system originates in a Western context and is assimilated by colonized cultures that it remains Western, according to scholars such as Egil Asprem, Julian Strube, Keith Cantú, and Liana Saif, who argue for the autonomy of the local agency in creating innovations on the material.

Antoine Faivre and Wouter Hanegraaff defined esotericism as a specifically Western phenomenon, intending to overcome the religionist paradigm of an "esoteric core" common to all religions or a perennial universalist truth. The term "Western" served to delimit esotericism not as a transhistorical essence of all religion, but highlighting it as a set particular to a historical current. Thus, in this sense, Asprem indicates that the term is as much opposed to "universal esotericism" as to geographically localized esotericisms: "The term is opposed not so much to "Eastern" (or "Northern" or "Southern") esotericism as to universal esotericism." Hanegraaff writes that the creation of a category of "Oriental esotericism" would have to be different from Faivre's inaugural definition: "It follows that if one were to conceive of an "Oriental esotericism" (whatever the definition), that would necessarily be something else." Karl Baier writes that the current comparative study of religions has more refined techniques and does not necessarily adopt a religionist agenda and that then the use of the comparative category "esotericism" is not precluded. According to Baier, the Faivre/Hanegraaff paradigm excludes any non-European agency, as if non-Western cultures could not actively contribute to or develop esotericism: "Yet research on modern yoga and in other fields of cross-cultural interactions between Near and Middle Eastern, South Asian and East Asian cultures, as well as African cultures and European or American esoteric currents, reveal globally entangled developments." Julian Strube also believes that esotericism was formed in a globally interwoven way and that Hanegraaff's current conceptual perspective repeats religionism and excludes non-Western developmental contexts.

According to Hanegraaff, Carl Jung was a major contributor in spreading the cross-cultural study of esotericism in a more global perspective, analyzing the Western occult tradition and seeking parallels with Eastern systems. He perceived two mentalities, a more rational conscious one and an unconscious one, and claimed that in studying thoughts of Western and Eastern cultures he found the same shared substratum of the collective unconscious, which could be studied historically, but which, according to Hanegraaff, corresponds to the reservoir of traditionally "rejected knowledge."

According to Marco Pasi, "if esotericism is not a universal phenomenon, but is specifically rooted in and limited to Western culture, then it should not be necessary to label it as 'Western'. The moment it is labeled as 'Western', it also becomes possible to assume that there are other 'non-Western' forms of esotericism." There is criticism, however, of the misapplication of esotericism to other contexts, such as that it has been used in religionist assumptions and has overflowed into other generalizing Western categories about non-Western cultures, such as shamanism. For instance, studies such as Marcel Griaule's have been criticized for inducing the creation of mystifications considered "esoteric" in a non-Western context: that of the African religion of the Dogon, in what he called "la parole claire" - the deepest level of secret knowledge. There are nuances to the analysis: the esoteric stems from notions of secrecy, although not every dimension of secrecy refers to the esoteric, such as shameful matters, and not every secret is initiatory. Apter suggests, in turn, that secret knowledge is not necessarily fixed in certain cultures, such as the esoteric of the Yoruba and Dogon, and is perhaps always fluid and changeable according to contexts. As for the East, European perspectives on religion have been influenced by trends in Orientalism, which in turn have influenced the attribution of esotericism into "esoteric Orientalism," often demeaning Eastern religious beliefs and practices as superstitious or irrational.

Esotericism, as a broad term in its ethical perspective, is a comparative category to worldviews or connected practices that are widespread in diverse cultures throughout history and around the world. However, in a second strict meaning, emically, it originates from strict historical currents in the interaction of different cultures, or as a Euro-American phenomenon, from Western esotericism.

However, it has become common to attribute Eastern esotericism to doctrines of Hinduism, as in the Tantras and Yoga; to branches of Buddhism found in India, China, Japan, Tibet, Korea, and Vietnam, calling it "esoteric Buddhism"; and to other non-sectarian practices, such as those of the Baul. One finds, for example, the analogical thinking system of external and internal correspondences (as macrocosm and microcosm) in Indian rituals and theories comparable to statements of Western esoteric systems, as well as practices of magic, alchemy, and divination. Richard Kaczynski points out that while it is not his intention "to conflate Eastern Tantra and Western Magic, although I find it heuristically useful to refer to both as forms of esotericism," he employs the "second-order (ethical) term that is applied by scholars to the subject under much more consistent scrutiny than it is used as a self-referential (emic) designation," with a reason for comparison just as Aleister Crowley did with regard to the similarities he saw between Eastern and Western traditions.

Cantú uses "Western" and "Eastern" for convenience, and writes that it is a notion that is implied from the division of "Western", yet vague: "My point is that postulating a Western esotericism also implies the postulation of an "Eastern esotericism," which even if not declared or not analyzed, creates a category that has no intrinsic existence apart from various disconnected movements, whether Islamic, Hindu, Buddhist, Taoist, or non-sectarian (e.g., the Fakir) who could justifiably be said to be participating in a type of esotericism." He proposes a more neutral and global approach to esotericism, considering the local, native, and trans-local dimensions, in which a system becomes diffuse and varied in multiple places as it moves away from its point of origin. With the flow from trans-local to local (called "localization"), assimilation of Western concepts can occur from the internal agency of members of colonized communities. It cannot, therefore, be said that the system loses its authenticity, even though there has been an influence in a return pollination movement from Europe to Asia, with the appropriation of new esoteric categories, as in Yoga. Thus, it indicates the existence of two dimensions: "translocal esotericism" and "local esotericism," from which the affirmation of authenticity and inauthenticity is locally constructed.

In any case, manifestations of esotericism are the result of a dynamic bricolage of ideas, coming from diverse places, sources, and cultures, but also among the practice's own discursive communities. This makes categorizations inconsistent and boundaries shift on the part of the very agents who analyze the phenomenon. Examples that bring difficulty are the use of the occult in modern Japan, in new religious movements such as the Oomoto, or the doctrine of Ruhollah Khomeini in Iran - both situations being asserted to be emic esoteric innovations avowedly opposed to Western thought; or else the emergence of new emic demarcations of esotericism by Eastern scholars, as by Masaharu Anesaki (1873-1949).

Against the historicist paradigm of considering esotericism as a discursive strategy exclusive to the epistemology of the West, Egil Asprem defends in a typological approach the usefulness of comparing non-Western esotericisms to verify if esotericism is a transcultural category that may have emerged independently in several places:

Looking beyond the particular to see how similar "thought forms," secret organizations, or claims to higher knowledge operate in contexts beyond the West (...), may even help uncover selection pressures and environmental factors that can help explain the emergence of esotericism in the "West" and formulate more precise and theoretically refined definitions. (...) What can the cognitive science of religion tell us about the generation and transmission of "thought forms" or "cognitive styles" considered unique to Western esotericism? Is there a dynamic of "convergent cultural evolution" that sheds light on the formation of "esoteric-type" groups, movements, discourses, experiences, or idea structures?

== Mesopotamia ==
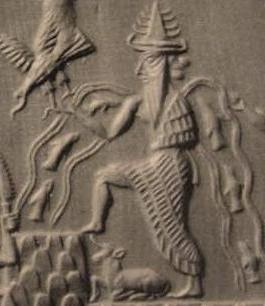
Enki, guardian of Me, god of groundwater and wisdom, with fish flowing from his shoulders and an eagle descending in front of him. Seal of Adda (ca. 2300 BCE, Akkadian Empire)

There was a well-established concept of secrecy in Mesopotamia, associated with reserved knowledge. One finds, for example, the words AD-ḪAL = pirištu (in Sumerian and Akkadian, respectively, meaning "secret"), Nì-DUL = katimtu ("hidden," "covered"), and (KI)-ÙRU = niṣirtu ("guarded"). According to the traditions of Mesopotamian religions, there were gods entrusted with the divine secrets and they passed on the knowledge to royalty individuals, who in turn passed it on to classes of scholars and scribes. Guardians of heavenly and earthly secrets included Enki/Ea, god of wisdom, Nabu, Inanna, as well as Ninshubur (who kept the secrets of the sky god Anu) and Nuska (who kept those of Enlil, king of the gods).

The Mesopotamians developed an esoteric scribal tradition, such as the collections of their rites or the practice of haruspice. Their tablets were copied and transmitted "from the man who knows to the man who knows." The arts of writing and writings were a secret, as stated in a Sumerian text from the 2nd millennium B.C. There are lexical lists from the 4th millennium B.C. taken as "secret knowledge of the sage," and giving a taxonomy of the world of esoteric tenor. There are instances of the use of cryptography as well: in the middle of the 3rd millennium B.C., an esoteric orthography called UD-GAL-NUN was invented and used for secret mythological narratives. From the end of the second millennium BCE onward, clauses are found on the tablets identifying the content as secret knowledge that could be passed from one knower only to another knower, and that infringing this by passing it on to an uninitiated was a "taboo of the gods."

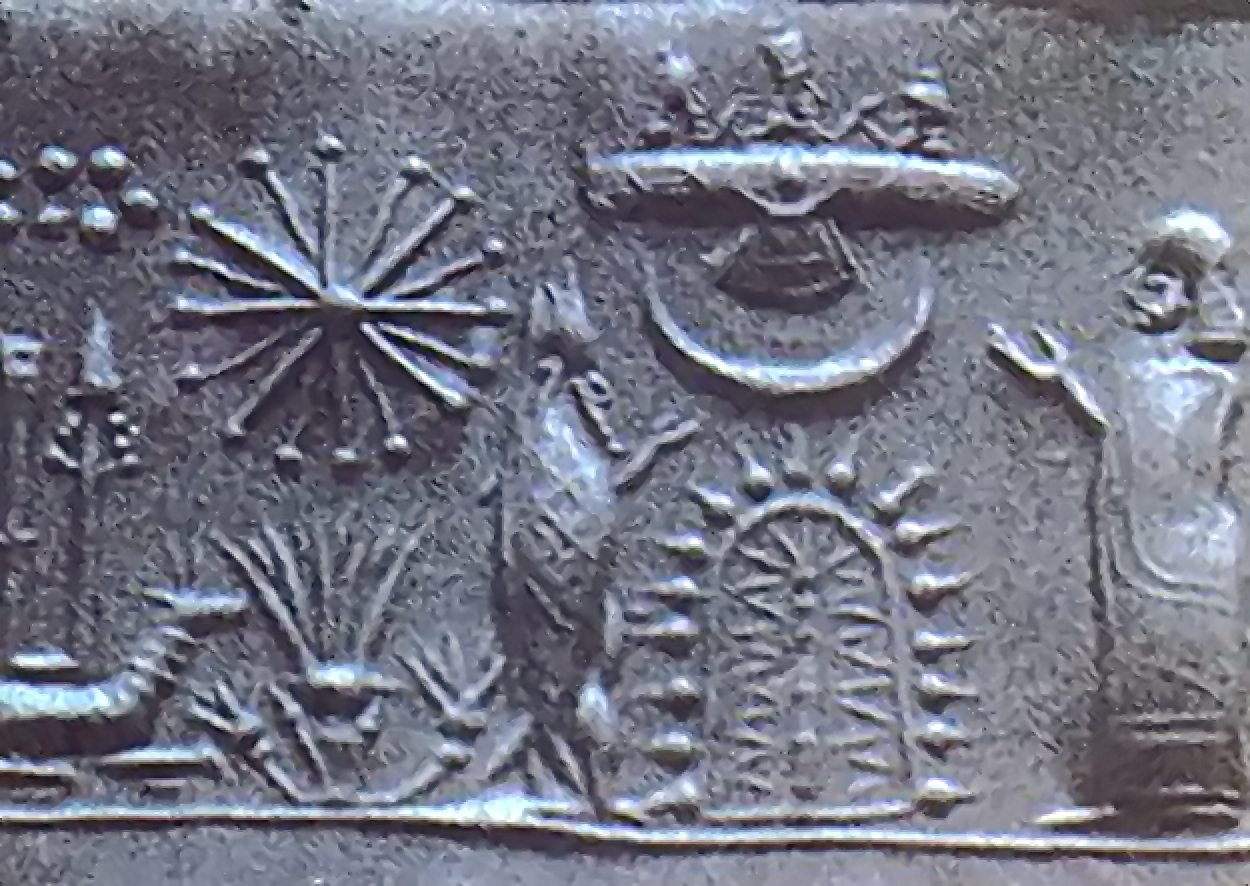
Mesopotamian seal from the first millennium B.C., showing a sage dressed as a fish and a worshiper in front of him, as well as celestial representations such as the winged solar disk symbol, a crescent moon, and a cluster of stars

Knowledge of exorcism and divination was also monopolized. The exorcist's function is nominally designated as secret (niṣirtu) in the Exorcist's Manual (1st millennium BCE), about which one reads is the (KAR 44:30-31): "totality of the sources of wisdom, the secrets of the art of incantations, the sources of the planes of heaven and earth, the secrets of the Lalgar (abyss) and the non-canonical incantations (ahû)". "Sources" is a metaphor for the underground water of Abzu, associated with the god of wisdom Enki, as an analogy of the origin of esoteric knowledge.

The monarch took on a social role as a medium of prophecy, often through the metaphor of the "sacred marriage". There is no evidence that the narratives about Sumerian rites of hierogamy (marriage between a deity and the king) or theogamy (marriage between gods) occurred literally, or that a sexual ritual consecration of the monarch with a priestess in sacred prostitution was necessarily performed. They were, however, a rhetorical way of showing that there was close communication between the monarch and the "secrets of the gods." The non-verbal erotic connection symbolically allowed for verbal mediation and this legitimized their power, in connection with the divine world. In Inanna's oracle to Ibal-pi-el II (r. c. 1779-1765 BCE), the goddess introduces herself as follows: "The secrets of the gods are before me. Because the invocation of my name is always in your mouth, I will reveal to you, one by one, the secrets of the gods." It is likely an element of secrecy in Inanna's cult since her information was passed on orally to a small elite. Her love songs are not explicitly said to be esoteric, but this may also be suggested by the scarcity of written material. The existing cultic texts, however, although said to be "secret," do not constitute evidence in themselves that there were secret cults or ritual initiations into mysteries to the Goddess of Love, but take on a connotative function of expressing divine approval in the royal ideology.

The Babylonian myths did not undergo any changes until after 900 B.C., and the scholars produced specialized and esoteric knowledge on top of the existing one. In Babylonian, the priest Berossus reported to the Greeks that the Babylonian myths were allegories, and that from their dissemination in a Hellenistic context the notion of an ancient legendary wisdom of the Chaldeans was spread, as the "Chaldean science" of astrology. The Mesopotamian thought of Assyrian and Babylonian esotericism was semiological in character, which interpreted the created things in the world as written signs of divine elocutions, which must be examined and deciphered in divination.

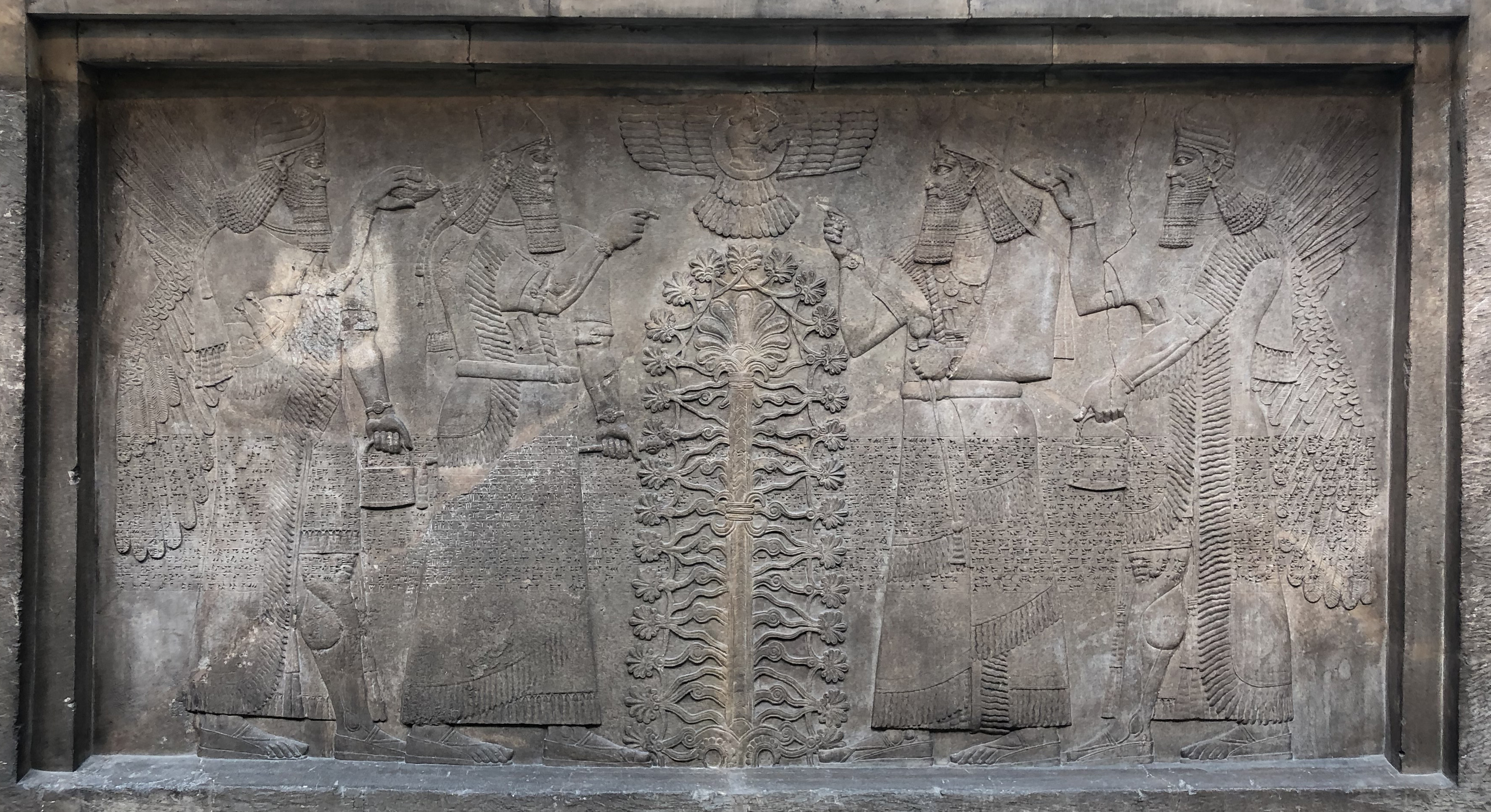
Symbolic scene of Ashurbanipal in ritual clothing, in front of a sacred tree, accompanied by winged jinn (865-860 BCE)

The name apkallu was given to legendary cultural heroes, descended from humans, who received divine wisdom and taught the antediluvian sciences. Chief among them was the mythical sage Adapa, reported by Berossus under the name Oannes, and seen as esoteric wisdom by the Greeks. Ashurbanipal boasted claiming that he had grasped "the art of the apkallu Adapa, the esoteric secret of the entire scribal tradition." J. van Dijk suggests that purification rituals may have had an esoteric aspect traced to the mythical sage Adapa and which extended to later local esoteric and Gnostic traditions, such as Mandaeism.

It is probable that the "magoi" Heraclitus referred to were either Persian priests or Babylonian exorcists. The nocturnal healing rituals he described, involving an imaginary trial of witches and sorcerers, with the lighting of a fire and invocations to break the spell of illness, are similar to those described in the Babylonian collection Maqlû.

== Zoroastrianism ==
An esoteric dimension is suggested in the interpretation of Zoroastrian texts, with scholars considering that there was a hierarchy of religious knowledge, as evidenced in some passages that refer to a deep reading dimension. In the article Esoteric trends in Zoroastrianism (1969), Shaul Shaked considers that Sassanid Zoroastrianism, although open, possessed an informal categorization that included the notion of hidden knowledge. He identifies the term rāz (literally "secret") as greater esoteric knowledge, reserved for members and initiated of a higher religious rank. Dan Sheffield also considers, from analysis of the Wizirgerd ï Denïg, that exegesis of the Avesta was guided by the idea that it contained secrets: "Now one must know with the help of intelligence and mind that mysterious utterances abound in the Avesta." He proposes the hypothesis that curiosity for seeking secrets led to the development of Zand (exegesis; literally, "interpretation"), as written in Denkard 6.215: "the dēn has seven walls, and they called the farthest one the sacred word and Zand." A decree from the reign of Khosrow I, however, limited the Zand to closed priestly circles, aiming at preserving moral order and preventing desecration by heretics: "Keep this Yasna secret, but teach the Zand to no one except your offspring." Thus Denkard 6 evidences:

One must be worthy of all the secrets (and) the battles of the gods; then, when a man is worthy, the gods themselves inform them of their secrets and battles, for the gods desire a trustworthy treasurer. The secret of the gods and their battles are not hidden from anyone, for you know that the more people know more, the more powerful the gods will be.

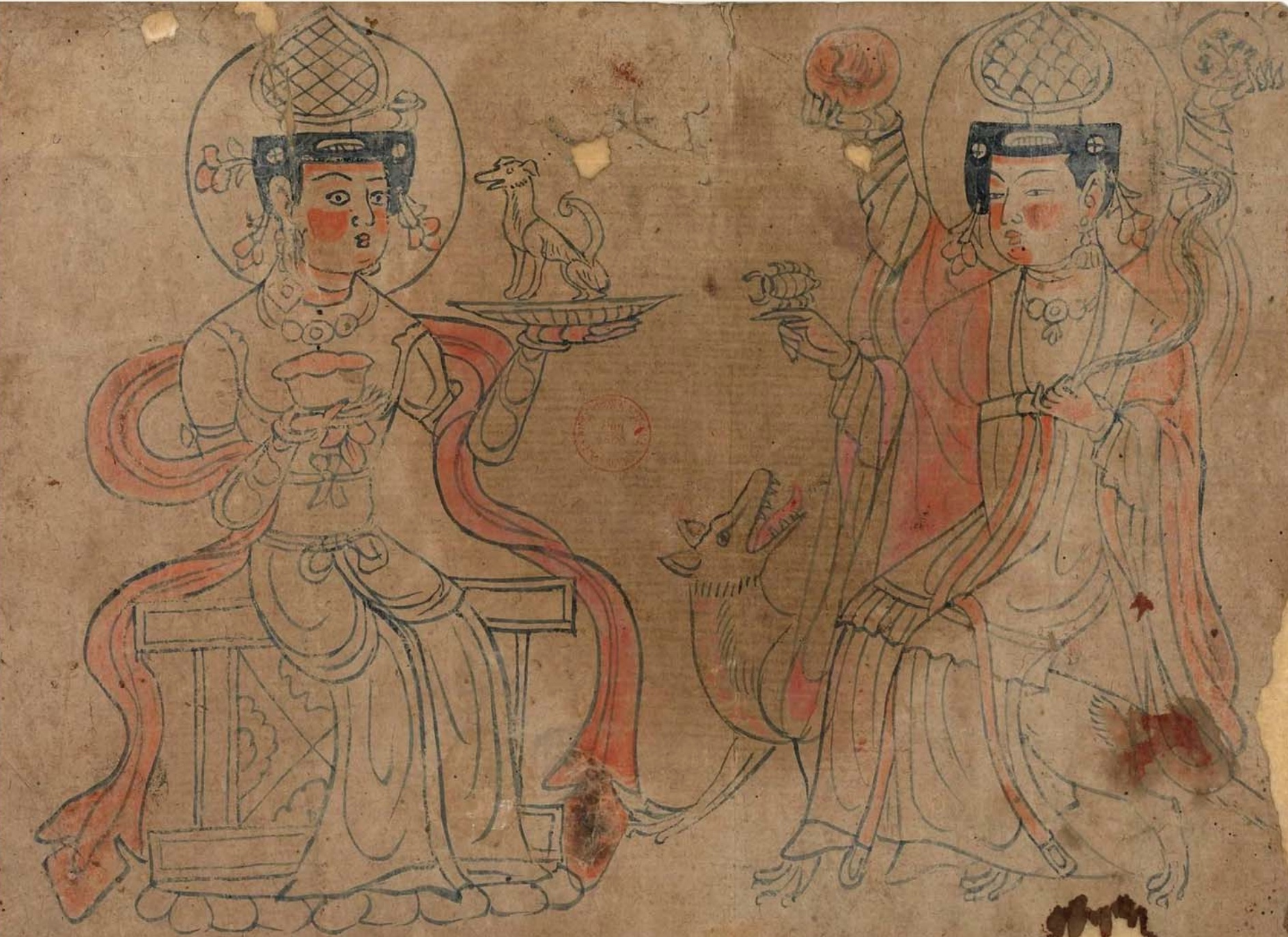
Sogdian Daenas (10th century), associated with the Zoroastrian cult in Sogdia. The figure on the left is considered to be Daena, while the one on the right is thought to be Daeva

In the poetics of the Yasna, Martin Schwartz identifies the existence of linguistic encryption in the structuring of the verses, as in they recommend themselves "to the knower" and signal a revelatory message with a presence of esotericism.

The main idea that scholars speculate is strongly rooted in the Avestan ritual is that of an opening of an esoteric path, through which priests could meet with Ohrmazd, gaining an early mental vision of the afterlife and the condition of saoshyant. During the sacrificial rite, it is hypothesized that there were ecstatic or esoteric components in which the officiant would also consecrate themselves by an internalization in which they elevated their soul, in celestial ascent. One of the titles of the priest Kartir was Ohrmazd mowbed, which for the Denkard, according to Prods Oktor Skjaervo, was "applied to people who revealed themselves as having the ability to see into the other world (mēnōy-wēnišnīh)." Kartir describes in his inscriptions his vision of the "final destination" according to such a special ritual context, in a deeply esoteric account of an encounter in Paradise with his female double dēn, "in the form of a woman".

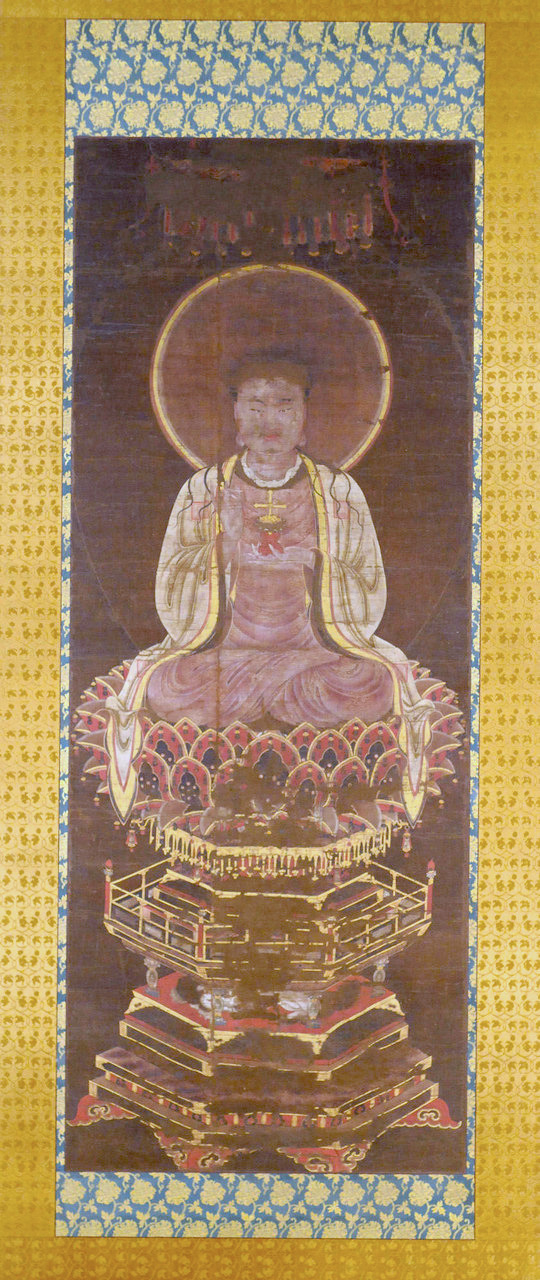
Manichaeian painting of the Buddha Jesus (13th century, southern China). In the Chinese version of Manichaeism, it is written, for example, in the Manichaean Compendium (year 731), a didactic exposition to the faithful regarding a representation of Mani: "(His) body fully exhibiting the Great Light has the esoteric meaning of the Unlimited."

James Russell speculates that the Zoroastrians believed in special knowledge about the end of the cosmic battle of Good and Evil, which, in addition to coming from the reading of the Gatha by a specialized class, would also include the employment of mystical techniques by spiritually advanced believers, such as ecstasy by wine or psychotropic substances (supposedly haoma), as well as silent meditation (in Avestan: tušnā-maitiš) and mantric recitations (in Avestan: manthra-).

The recitation of the most important hymn, the Ahuna Vairya, is strongly linked to cosmological components, and implies a secret knowledge held by the priest that possesses it, possibly correlating it to the 21 constellations of the northern part of the sky. These constellations and those of the Zodiac were symbolized equally on the utensils of the ritual table, and a pattern of choreography by the priests indicates positions of the spatial axes and stages celestial movements, in an act to defeat the Evil Spirit.

Henrik Samuel Nyberg and Mary Boyce suggest that a change in the calendar during the Achaemenid period in which four days were now dedicated to the "Creator," supposedly Ahura Mazda, in places previously occupied by other Yazata (deities), may be evidence of a nod by Achaemenid monarchs to the esoteric belief in Zurvanism as the original Being who would preexist the two principles and who possesses a tetradic trait. This underlying design was, however, in covert form, not gaining popular support.

A Judeo-Christian tradition viewed the "Magi of the East" in a positive light, due to the narrative of the Biblical Magi, in which they had contact with the revelation of supernatural secrets. Some other Christians, on the other hand, accused them of an alleged veiling. Contact with the religious knowledge and rites of the Persian priests impressed the Greeks, fostering both a good and a bad perspective in the imagination due to the exoticism. The term "magic" and context of magic in the Greco-Roman world was derived from the Persian word for Zoroastrian "Magi".

There was also an esoteric legacy from the Magi in the interaction between Masdaism and Christianity in the East, as in the Christian transmission to Iranian Zoroastrians. According to this, Christ was presented several times as having already been prophesied by Zoroaster, as being the Saoshyant, what may have been locally associated in speculations about the three sons of Zoroaster and their relations to the "Universal Divine Time" (Zurvan), in a Zurvanic tetrad before the Ohrmazd.

Manichaean doctrines derived many aspects from Zoroastrian terminology and thought, combining and modifying them with Judeo-Christian, Buddhist, and Gnostic ideas within an esoteric framework to explain life and death. Unlike Zoroastrianism, Mani's system regarded matter as an evil principle. According to Götz König, the Zoroastrianists, likely critical of Manichaeism saw in it a heresy of esoteric interpretation that perverted the "true" understanding of the sacred texts. There is a record of accusations against the doctrine of principles elaborated by Mani, and the Manichaean textual technique elaborated a model on the Gatha in which new elements were assigned to the names of the gods.

In the 6th century, the sect of Mazdak arose from the teachings of Zardusht Khorragan and his disciple Mazdak. They expounded a Zoroastrianism with esoteric elements, incorporating a Gnostic vision and light symbolism to advocate a philosophy of love and social reform, as interpreters of Zoroaster's message and the Avesta. Mazdak stated that the "secret sense" (nehani) was necessary knowledge for their faith, probably referring to the esoteric senses of the Avesta.

In the 9th century, the Denkard presented evidence of a hermeneutical interpretation of the Gatha that shared the paradigm of "omnisignificance" according to James Kugel, analogous to the rabbinic traditions of Talmudic commentators, with a search for parallelism between texts and a possible reinterpretation of every word in divine scripture as containing a latent cryptic meaning. The Wizīdagīhā ī Zādspram ("Selections from Zadspram") is also another independent text from the same century within the Zoroastrian tradition, involving medical conceptions, numerology, and astrology to cosmic speculations, in contexts that may denote esoteric meaning.

Azar Kayvan (16th-17th centuries), asserting that the end of the Islamic millennium was near, declared an era with Persian superiority and founded the Abadi order, combining Sufi, gholātī, and Illuminationist ideas with Zoroastrian texts. Followers believed that his new scriptures, Dasatir-i-Asmani, were divinely revealed. The work was composed in an artificial language and accompanied by Persian commentaries, and Kayvān considered that those who were not Zoroastrian abadis did not understand that the Zend-Avesta was the esoteric (ta'vīl) interpretation of the Dasatir.

In the early 20th century, a movement called Ilm-e Kshnoom ("Path of Enlightenment" or "Beatific Knowledge"), founded by Behramshah Nowroji Shroff, was influenced by the Theosophical Society and claimed to possess the esoteric knowledge of Zoroastrianism.

== Hinduism ==
Linguistically, several Sanskrit terms are considered close to the notion of esoteric: adhyātmika ("spiritual"), alaukika ("unworldly"), alaukika jñāna ("spiritual knowledge"), gupta ("hidden"), gupta sādhana ("secret rituals"), siddha darśana ("hidden perception").

Several scholars use the term "Hindu esotericism" in comparison to the alchemical and hatha elements of Hindu mysticism, connected primarily with Tantrism. There are also culturally Hindu spiritual lineages of direct transmission and initiation, involving a master and a pupil, going back at least to 1500-1000 B.C.. Elizabeth De Michelis considers that, despite parallels in the category of esotericism, esoteric Hindu practices are much more widely accepted and employ elements of the conventional tradition of classical Hinduism, while Western esotericism has the connotation of being a fringe set compared to orthodoxy. The category on a west–east axis appeared during the modern development of Hinduism, with processes of esotericization and cross-influence, for example in Neo-Vedanta and Yoga. According to Richard Kaczynski, "One can generalize that in both Indian and Western esotericism there is a tendency to sublimate the religious quest."

Gordan Djurdevic considers Yoga as analogous to magic in the search for powers (considered sacred), a cultivation of imagination (corresponding to meditation), and containing the principle of eros (search for union). He also points to the category of esotericism according to Antoine Faivre's definitions as a cross-cultural phenomenon and applicable to the Nāth Siddhas, who share the components of the doctrine of correspondences (macrocosm-microcosm), living nature (in the concept of Shakti), transmutation (as the "reversal" of ulṭa sādhana), the practice of concordance (in the ideal of unitive wisdom of diverse traditions), the transmission of knowledge by initiation, and gnosis in their yogic practices. They were also one of the first religious groups in medieval India to make use of the vernacular language rather than Sanskrit to transmit esoteric ideas, but they equally made use of rhetorical strategies in a "secret language," such as employing paradoxes in the poems to indicate a reversal of the ordinary world, in an "upside-down language" (Ulṭabāmsī).

The tantra is considered a sprout of Vedic-Brahmanic and Yogic traditions whose system is mainly characterized by correspondences of macrocosm and microcosm and also by a reintegration of the mundane into the salvational path, such as the ritual employment of sexuality and dualism to achieve non-duality. The erotocentric rites are sometimes referred to as "left hand" (vāmācāra) in Hindu sayings, but not by Buddhists. In Sanskrit literature and the testimony of the practicing tantric, an outer Indian origin is attributed to them. In India, Buddhic tantrism assimilated Hindu gods as symbols, as well as in Japan in syncretism with the Shinto, and in Tibet with the native Bon gods.

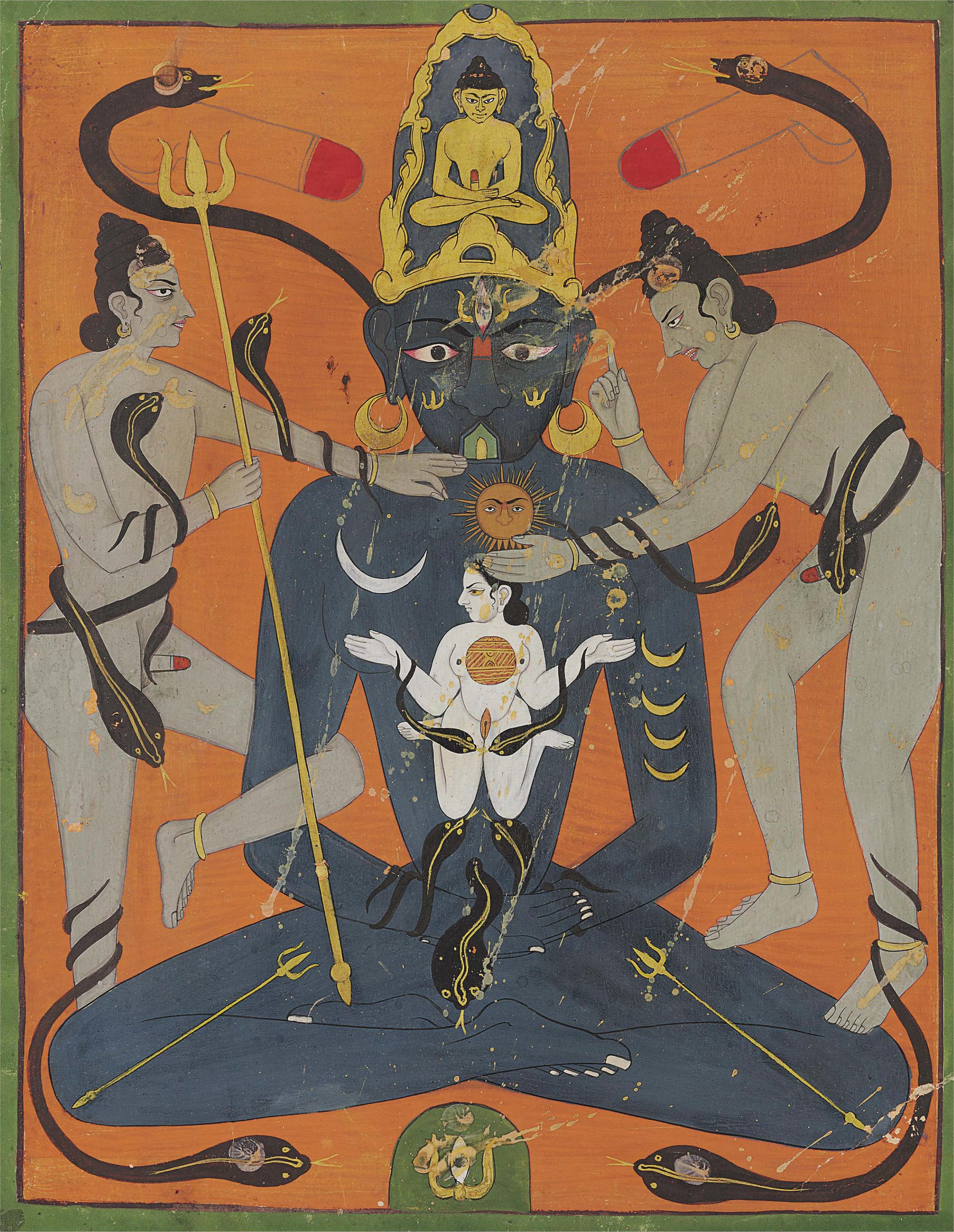
Kundalini Tantra painting (18th century), depicting celestial cosmic aspects on the body and the movement of the kundalini as naja snakes wrapped around the yogi.

Many of its elements are native to India, but it is difficult to know which originate from Vedic doctrines and which from Buddhist doctrines; they likely influenced each other and drew on other non-Hindu sources. It is also difficult to trace, with Shaivist tantras appearing in the 9th and 10th centuries, while Buddhist tantras can be more accurately dated to the level of decades and with more evidence to earlier eras. Thus, what can be asserted is that there were several connections among the Indian traditions, yet each with equally unique developments. In addition to Buddhist and Pancharatran/Shaivist literature, the tantras used the Dharani literature as well as political sources on an ideology of kingship, as seen in the earliest tantric system of Ekākṣara-uṣṇīṣa-cakravartin ("The Universal Emperor of the Buddha's Uṣṇīṣa [assuming the aspect of] a Single Syllable").

The foundational Kulārṇava Tantra text from the 12th century states that the doctrines of the Vedas, Sastras, and Puranas can be revealed, but that those of the Shaivist and Shaktist agamas (i.e., the tantras) must be kept secret.

Tantras considered fundamental are the Guhyasamāja Tantra (compiled in the 5th-6th centuries), Cakrasaṃvara (8th century), Hevajra, Vajravārāhī, Kālacakra, among other Anuttara Yoga texts (later, between the 8th and 11th centuries). Many of its elements and statements are considered subversive, such as the behavior of the Siddhas, but these writings have also been interpreted as rejecting literal meaning and assuming a symbolic narrative, as through a coded language: Sandhābhāṣā, a language "with intent," which is intentionally obscure to the uninitiated, being one of the main methods of Indian discourses, not unique to Buddhist traditions. Max Müller first translated this Sanskrit term as "hidden sayings," E. Burnouf in 1852 as "cryptic speech," and Haraprasad Shastri in 1916 as "twilight language", a term preferred by some recent scholars but also criticized by others). The translation "secret language" or "coded language" has also been proposed."

In Indian esoteric movements, a secret language has several functions, such as avoiding persecution and judgment on practices that were marginal according to social norms. In addition, secrecy gained symbolic meaning with its elitism and social empowerment, in which heterodox communities opposed the traditional class hierarchy. It also served as protection, in which knowledge considered dangerous was not divulged. On the other hand, the alleged danger and destructive power of the veiled teaching also generated attraction: announcing the existence of a secret to outside listeners was part of a frequent strategy of esotericism, that of pseudo-simulation, precluding its disclosure.

Numerology is also of importance to tantric terminology:

The fivefold classification presented in the tantras is remarkably comprehensive, embracing objects of every conceivable kind; it includes the infamous set of "five Ms" (fish, meat, wine, mudrā, sexual intercourse) and even a set of five "bodily fluids" (feces, urine, blood, semen, flesh). In addition, it includes sets of doctrinal principles, such as the five skandhas (factors of existence), the four kāyas (Buddha bodies), and the triad prajña, upāya, bodhicitta ("wisdom", "means", "enlightened mind"). Prajña, upāya, and bodhicitta are identified with the triads female/masculine/union, Amitābha/Akṣobhya/Vairocana, and so on, and thus are implicitly assigned to the groups of water, fire, and space, respectively.

Language and vocalization also acquired mystical connotations, as in the notion of Sanskrit having been considered a "sacred language," and its sounds and characters, from consonants and vowels to syllables and words, acquiring an occult and secretive background. In the Upanishads, one finds speculations about the mystical efficacy of ritual language and speech, as with the sound Om. The cryptic aspect of Vedic riddles was also professionally held by Brahmin priests, as initiates of the rituals of esoteric secrets. Public riddle rituals or riddle competitions were held at sacrifices, and verse riddles were also popular in private circles.

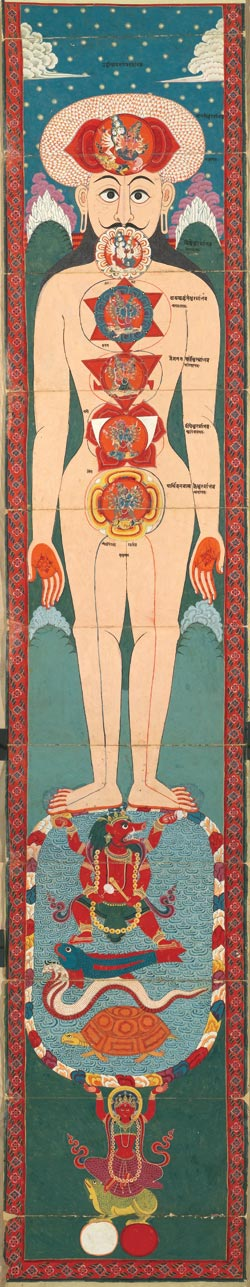
Chakras in the subtle body (Nepal, 17th century)

In several tantric sects, the phenomenon of sound production by the human body is considered to correspond to macrocosmic dimensions, as a replica of Creation processes, from the Origin, defining in Hindu theology a metaphysics of the Word and phonic and phonetic cosmogonies. Sound is seen as a divine substance, as well as with Sanskrit, justifying meditative techniques of mantra recitation in which there is correspondence to the symbolic meanings of each letter, syllable, or word and its sacrosanct chanting in mantras. In the Śakta Tantra, the sexual polarity of Brahman (male, and female) is considered to participate in cosmic evolution and creation in an analogy to human reproduction: the cosmic sound, nāda-brahman, is considered the primordial vibration resulting from the sexual act of Shiva and Shakti, which is transmitted to the vibrations of human activity and speech and is concentrated at the original point of sound, nāda-bindu. Thus, importance is assigned to oral instructions by a guru, such as of mantra formulas and bījas, which are symbolic. It is described in the opening verses of the Śāradā-tilaka Tantra (11th century):

From Shakti comes nāda, that is, the nasal sound represented by a semicircle and here put apparently for unmanifest sound. From nāda comes bindu, that is, the point representing anusvāra. This bindu possesses the qualities of the highest Śakti and is itself made of three parts, namely, bindu, nāda, and bīja. From the division of this higher bindu, the sound is produced. The sound that is thus created takes the form in letters and words. Letters and words form mantras; therefore, mantras embody, as it were, the power of Shakti, which is the power of Parameshvara .

According to these systems, the resonance emitted in the pronunciation of the letters and their combinations resonates in the creation of nāda-brahman in various effects, such as the unification of the practitioner in return to Brahman. The energy centers of the body (chakras) are also associated as reservoirs of latent letters and syllables (mātṛkās) according to their lotus petals, and the esoteric initiations called dīkṣās largely refer to this distribution of letters. Importance is also given to the Word (Vāc) in the Shaivist doctrines, such as the one by Abhinavagupta (c. 950–1016), with parāvāc as the uncreated and primordial Word (in essence, the highest level of reality, corresponding to pure consciousness, but also encompassing all levels of words). Thus, Tantrism recognizes greater psychosomatic and contemplative applications in a science of mantras (mantra-śāstra), connecting the vibrations (spanda) of sounds to deities, physical elements, and abstract concepts.

Meditative methods of visualizing deities were also inherited by Tantrism. In Buddhism, instructions for visualization precede the esoteric strands and are not unique to it, because they are also found in Shaivism.

One of the tantric groups best known for scandalous practices was the Kāpālikas, active in Medieval India, between the 7th and 8th centuries. Their name is derived from kapāla ("skull"), because they used a human skull as a begging bowl. They were followers of Shiva and revered the angry form of this god, Bhairava, imitating him in transgressive rituals, such as smearing their bodies with ashes from cremation grounds, orgiastic practices, human sacrifices, consumption of meat and alcohol. David Lorenzen considers, however, the scarcity of primary sources, and believes that historical information about them may be fictions of other traditions to disparage them. The only surviving sect today that is derived from the Kāpālikas is the Aghori, who are similar to their predecessors and usually dwell in mortuary camps. According to Ronald L. Barrett, they lean to both the "left-hand path" and the "right-hand path," and their mortuary Sādhanā serves to sever attachments and aversions, foregrounding primordiality in return for an uneducated and undomesticated view:

Aghor gurus and disciples believe that their state is primordial and universal. They believe that all human beings are born Aghori. Hari Baba has said on several occasions that human babies in all societies have no discrimination and that they play in their dirt as well as with the toys around them. Children become progressively discriminating as they grow up and learn the culturally specific attachments and aversions of their parents. Children become increasingly aware of their mortality as they hit their heads and fall to the ground. They come to fear their mortality and then mitigate that fear by finding ways to deny it altogether.

In Bengal, from the 17th to the 19th centuries there was a development of esoteric tantric groups with yogic practices, such as the Karthābaja and Vaiṣṇava Sahajiyā, involving sexual rituals, although to some extent there were exoteric expressions in devotional movements as well. As an example, in verses from the Amtarasāvalī (c. 1750) of the Vaiṣṇava Sahajiyā, an adapted analogy is employed: of the "river" as a "yogic channel" to which the sexual fluids and consciousness of the practitioner must travel from the mundane, to reach a celestial and beatific place called "The Place of the Hidden Moon" (guptacandrapur).

In the Mughal Empire of the 17th century, Prince Dara Shukoh made the first translation of the Upanishads into another language outside the Indian sphere, in the book of c. 1657 Sirr-i-Akbar ("The Great Secret"), with his personal interpretation. As in his other comparative work on Hindu traditions, Majma-ul-Bahrain ("The Meeting Point of the Two Oceans", c. 1655), Dara was influenced by the ancient Islamic historiography which considered that the Indians possessed a polytheistic religion of the masses, while a monotheistic aspect was reserved for an elite. Furthermore, in accordance with a perennialist tendency, he traced a monotheistic "esoteric truth" to the Indian work, and affirmed the god Brahman as being the prophet Adam, who would have made a revelation before Muhammad on par with the doctrine of tawhid ("Unity") in the Koran. He identified the Indian corpus as the "hidden book" (kitāb maknūn) and "mother of the book" (umm al-kitāb) mentioned in the Quran. Dara influenced the Western reception through Abraham Hyacinthe Anquetil-Duperron, who was the first European translator of the Upanishads and also considered them a source of hidden knowledge, believing in a "doctrina orientalis" according to categories of prisca theologia and Western esotericism.

From the 1880s onwards, scholars from South Asia, mostly Bengalis, intervened in the journal The Theosophist in favor of Tantra, comparing it to European occult doctrines and, in a manifestation of their own agency, publicized it with the term "Indian occultism".

== Buddhism ==
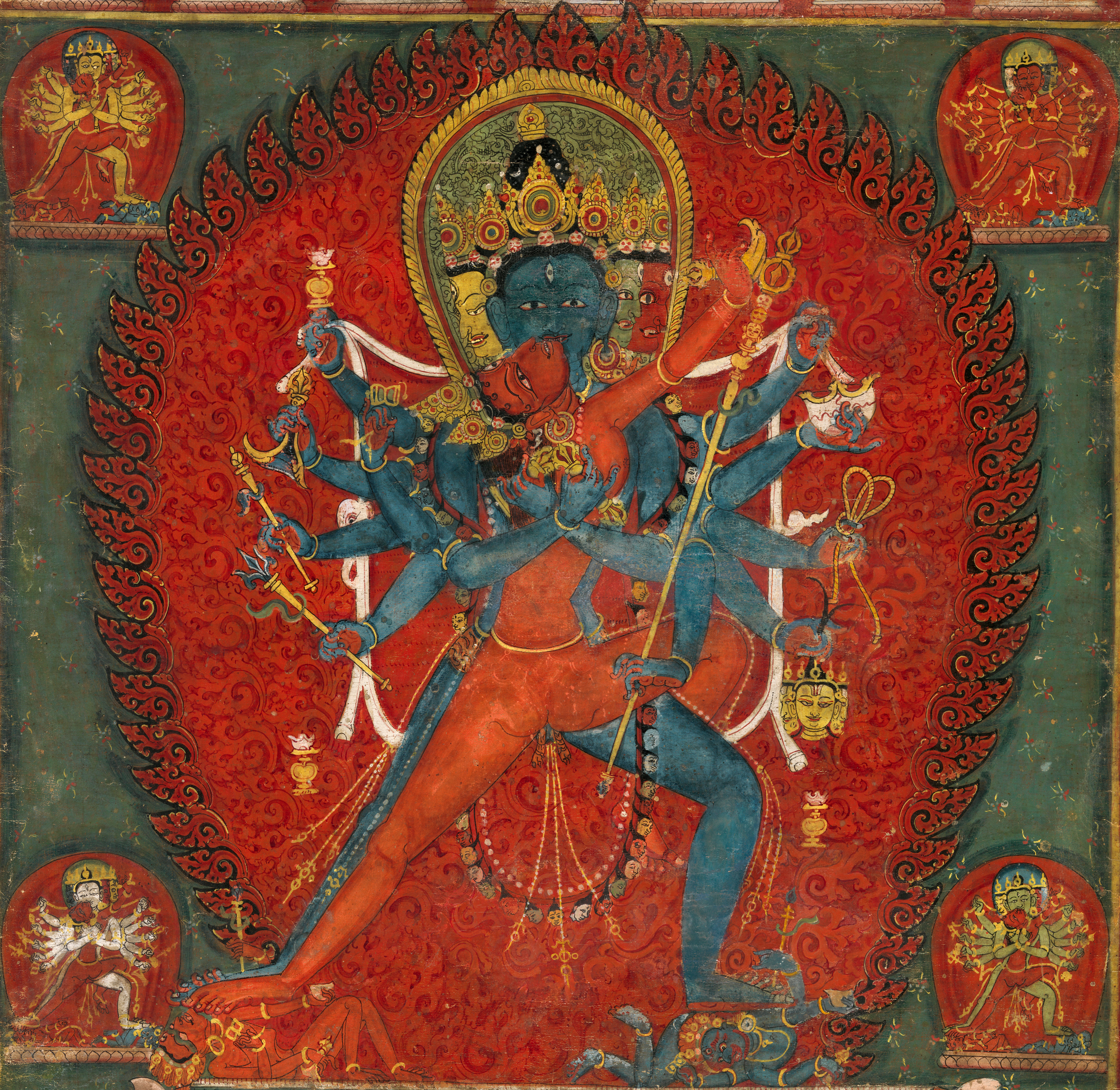
Chacrasamvara embracing his consort Vajravārāhī (Yab-Yum). Nepal, 17th century

"Esoteric Buddhism" is a modernly created designation, but corresponds in part to the East Asian phenomenon through the indigenous terms mijiao (密教) and mimi (秘密), which may be translations of the Indian term guhya ("secret"). The mere equation of these terms, however, presents problems. In general, the terms "tantric Buddhism," "esoteric Buddhism," and "Vajrayana"- vajra meaning "diamond" or "ray", regarding the unchanging and indestructible state of awakening - are also used interchangeably. In China, Chinese Esoteric Buddhism is generally regarded as having been first established and popularized by Śubhakarasiṃha, Vajrabodhi and Amoghavajra during the Tang dynasty (618 - 907), although elements of esoteric Buddhist practices such as the ritual usage of dharanis were already present in China as early as the fifth century.

According to Ronald M. Davidson, the minimum requirements that define esoteric Buddhism are an entrance ritual, a mandala, homa rituals, mudras, mantras, and the caveat of secrecy. The earliest Dharma scriptures that describe ritual performances such as fire sacrifice (homa) and offering to the sacred fire (yajña) are from the sixth century, such as the Dhāraṇīsaṃgraha of Atigupta (Atikuta), which describes an arrangement of figures, ritual consecration, homa offerings, and conditions the establishment of mandala within a pavilion as secret, forbidding disciples to speak of it to anyone who had not been given abhisheka, whereas in the Amoghapāśahṛdaya, the abhisheka rite is presented not as a transmission ritual, but as a purificatory one to pacify the disturbances of a country. Ritual or mantra collections are traced to the 5th and 7th centuries, while collections of magic continue to the present. This early material is usually called "proto-tantric" in critical literature. Some of these compendia may have been alternatively referred to as Vidyādhara-piṭaka ("Sorcerer's Basket") and served as inspiration for other surviving collections, which have an affinity to Siddha literature as well.

Some point out that hidden Buddhist teachings may date back as far as the third century, according to evidence of tantric systems such as the Three Mysteries in the 密迹金剛力力士経 (Guhyakādhipatinirdeśa), and reports of transmission by orality, which left no material evidence. However, not all scholarly strands consider that esoteric Buddhism falls within the category of tantrism, or that all esoteric Buddhism would be tantric. The Pratyutpanna Samādhi Sūtra (1st century BCE-2nd century) can be considered proto-esoteric in its content and also a precursor of the Pure Land lineage. Although Tantra and Pure Land esotericism had different goals, the latter aimed to attain Sukhavati paradise and other Buddhist lands where even more sublime esoteric techniques could be developed. Both were developments of Mahayana and were not mutually exclusive.

Southern Esoteric Buddhism, also referred to as "Esoteric Theravada", presents esoteric transmission and meditative elements similar to those of Tantrism, but was not influenced by Tantric and Sanskrit literature; it appears to have developed independently and its texts are in Pali; differently from Vajrayana, there is an absence of sexual rituals in this esoteric Buddhist category.

One of the most distinctive features of esoteric Buddhism compared to esoteric Hinduism occurs in the symbolic assignment of the male/female polarity: in erotocentric Buddhist practice, the feminine is seen passively as "wisdom" (prajña), while the masculine is considered in the dynamic role of "method" (upaya); in esoteric Hinduism, the reverse is true: the feminine symbolizing power and activity, and the masculine wisdom and passivity.

There is a conflict within the non-esoteric and esoteric schools of Buddhism when it comes to the claims that the Buddha would have hidden nothing and revealed everything and that he would have reserved secret teachings. On the other hand, it is considered in pre-Mahayana (or non-Mahayana) scriptures that the Buddha did not reveal everything by keeping silent about unanswered questions, although they may have reconciled this with the claim that he had not withheld them either. There was a transition in the degree of secrecy and transparency between early and late Buddhism, at first emphasizing the transparency of the Buddha's teachings in comparison to the Vedic secrecy of the Brahmins. There are scriptures from the Pāli Canon that deny secrecy, as in the Mahāparinibbāṇa Sutta (Dīghanikāya 16 II,100), and also from the Mahayana, such as the Mahāparinirvāṇamahāsūtra tatagatagarba:

O Exalted One! How is [this]? Are there any secrets in what has been taught by the Exalted One? Please do not keep [any teachings] secret in the form of 'intentional statements' (ābhiprāyikaṃ vacanam: dgongs pa'i tshig = bsam pa can gyi tshig). O Exalted One! How is [this]? Are the Buddha's teachings similar to an illusory woman, a magical creation, created by the magical (diagrammatic) device (yantra: 'khrul 'khor) of an illusionist and magician?" [The Exalted One] replied, "There are no secrets in my teachings, and the Buddha's teachings, like a crescent moon in autumn, are spotless, untainted with marks, without confusion, free from secrets and great secrets, and are transparent (or clear).

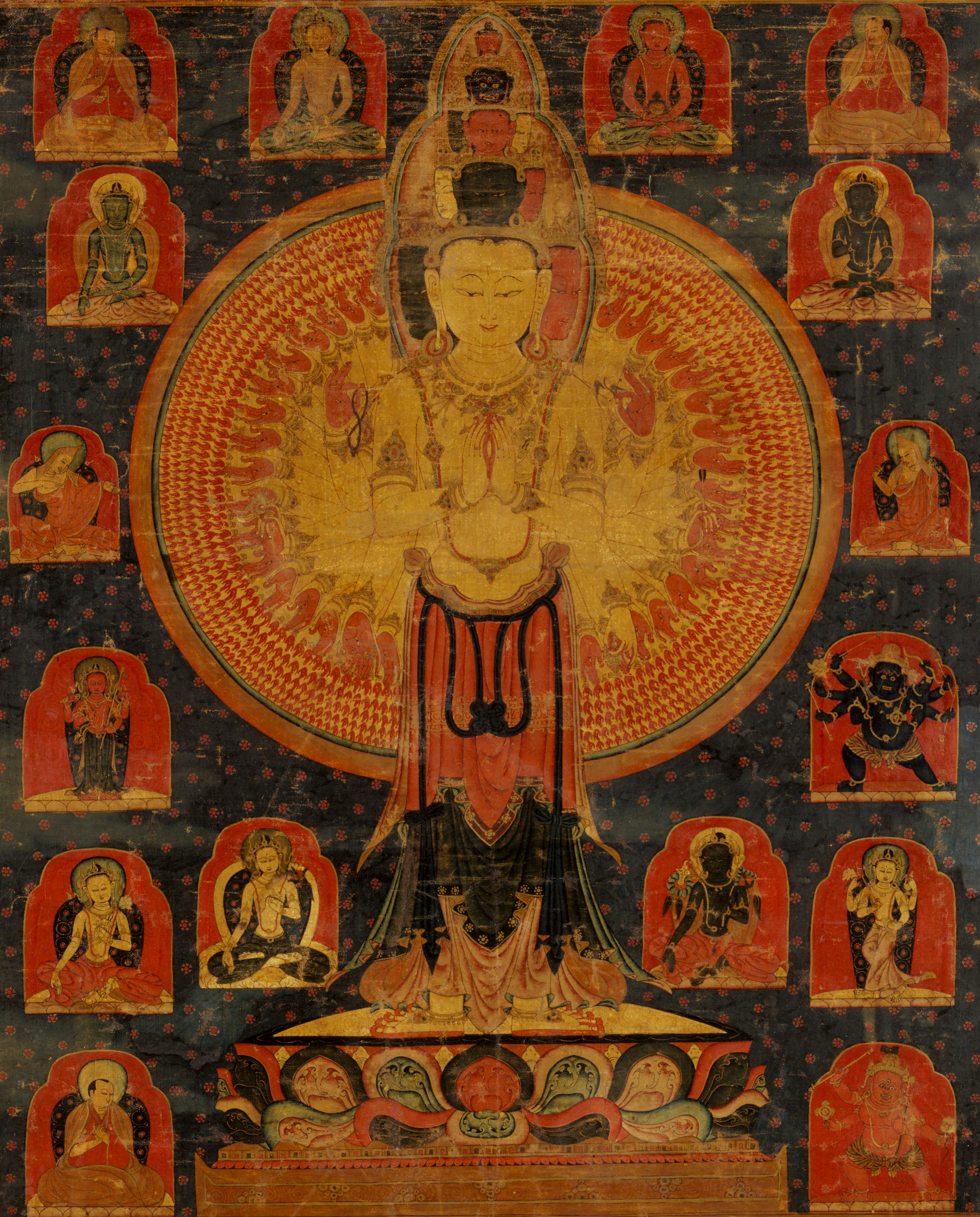
Avalokiteśvara of a Thousand Arms, Tibetan thangka (14th century)

Another considered dimension of the secret is that of epistemic mystery, seen by the Mahayana, in that ordinary cognition and conceptualization have no access to the extraordinary reality of awakened beings. Third and fourth-century Chinese texts already made the distinction from previous Hinayana doctrines, considered "exoteric" and simple, while they called the Mahayana esoteric (mijiao) and defended it as superior and profound. Vajrayana, on the other hand, considers what they call the "Secret Vehicle" (in Tibetan: gsang ba'i theg pa), a term consolidated in Tibetan texts attributed to Padmasambhava and others from the 11th century, equivalent to the Sanskrit expression guhyayāna found in tantras. Meanwhile, they attribute the "exoteric" or "external" (bāhya = phyi) to other non-mantric vehicles.

There is a degree of secrecy among the tantras, in classes and hierarchical systems, and Taranatha (1575-1634) suggests that secrets exist because they are of higher quality, impenetrable or hardly cognitively accessible, or rare. There are scriptures of the yogatantric system that state a commandment of "non-disclosure of secrets" of the mantric precepts, and dissemination of tantric scriptures or improper translations were forbidden by royal decrees. On this, Rongzompa (11th century) provides an explanation:

[The kind of secret] that is unfit to know, consisting [as it is] of such [deeply] real and surprising types of [mantric] conduct, is not capable or suitable to be the domain of [ordinary] people of the world and [followers of] lower vehicles, and thus must be kept secret from [them], and thus [the vehicle that teaches such doctrines] is called the Secret Vehicle (gsang ba'i theg pa). (...) As for not disseminating secret teachings to unworthy [individuals], it is as the following teaches: [Only] if one performs activities for the benefit of sentient beings, through the lower vehicles, until a mind that knows such a [Vajrayana view] arises [in them] that sentient beings will be tamed, and not ruined. Thus [Vajrayana] must be kept extremely secret and is therefore taught as the Secret Vehicle.

=== Japan ===
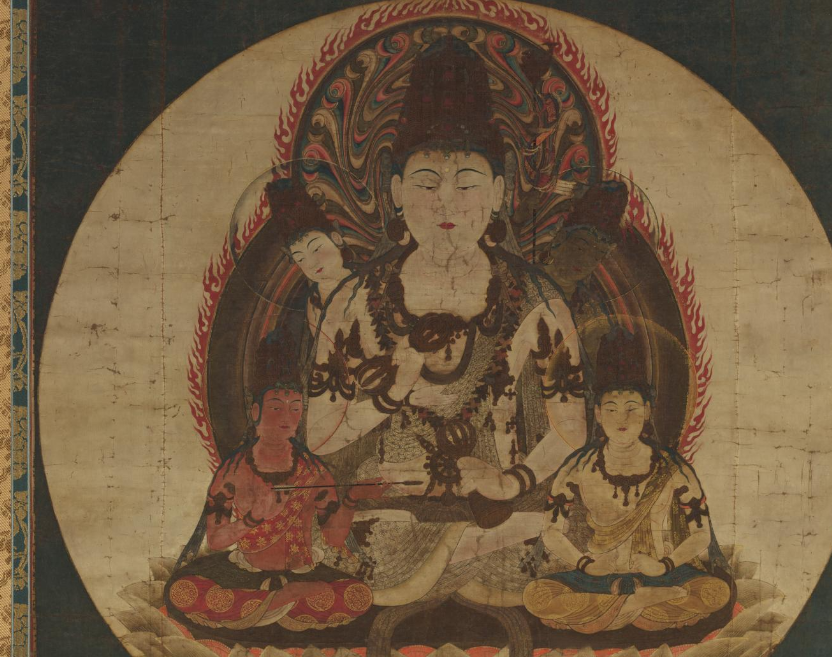
The Secret Five ("Gohimitsu Bosatsu", 13th century): one of the most secret mandalas that Kūkai may also have brought from China. Used in rituals to convert negative aspects into positive ones. At the center Kongōsatta is the enlightened mind, and around it are the bodhisattvas representing the four human illusions, of non-duality.

Japanese esoteric Buddhism (Himitsu-bukkyō or Mikkyō) was created according to the Tendai and Shingon schools. To distinguish between them, Shingon was referred to as "Eastern Esotericism" (Tōmitsu), due to the location of one of its main temples in Kyoto, while the Tendai esoteric practice (Mikkyō) was referred to as Taimitsu. In turn, Taimitsu was subdivided into the Ennin and Enchin lineages, while Tōmitsu was into the Ono and Hirosawa lineages. At the apex of Japanese Tantrism (11th to 14th centuries), the two competing Taimitsu traditions of Ennin and Enchin were referred to as Sanmon (Mountain branch) and Jimon (Temple branch), with a distinct set of rituals.

Some scholars of Japanese Buddhist history have also distinguished a "pure esotericism" (junmitsu) of the Heian period, formed by the Tendai and Shingon traditions transmitted from China and whose practices emphasized the transformation of the practitioner into an enlightened being, in contrast to a "mixed esotericism" (zōmitsu) of the Nara period, which was more devoted to ritual recitations of daranis and rarely to mudras and visualizations, as well as aiming more at healing and the hither of supernatural powers rather than enlightenment. However, this paradigm is questioned, as this pair was conceived only in the mid Tokugawa period, and uses of doxographies and taxonomies such as these may be anachronistic.

Historians have traditionally considered the Tōmitsu branch as the "orthodox" one of Japanese tantrism, due to the relevance of Kūkai, but the Taimitsu tradition also developed some contributions to East Asian tantrism, such as their scholastic study of the concept of "esoteric" and its reformulation, seeking to categorize the esoteric teachings (emmitsu itchi) in a taxonomy. Moreover, they accomplished the creation of a third hermeneutic category between the Womb and Diamond Mandalas: the Lotus Mandala, which encompassed the previous two and was emblematic of non-duality and the overcoming of esoteric and exoteric. There were different levels of meaning in the scholastic classifications of the clerics, in which many of the esoteric teachings used non-esoteric teachings of the Mahayana traditions, and the esoteric and exoteric had some degree of identification.

Thus, according to Lucia Dolce, a simple dichotomy between the esoteric and secret that is not esoteric is not possible, and the Taimitsu likely tried to build an alternative system of Mikkyō, based on the ideal of unity of esoteric and exoteric. There was a process of esotericization in medieval Japan, with constant alternations between esoteric and exoteric in ritual programs. As stated in the Keiran Shūyōshū (14th century), the secret meaning of the esoteric is found in multiple combinations of esoteric and non-esoteric elements, and the exoteric and esoteric are the same (kenmitsu funi). In the exegesis of the esoteric liturgies of the Lotus Sutra, they are presented by the encyclopedist as the "secret within the exoteric-esoteric system" (kenmitsu chū himitsu).

In Japan, Ennin was the first to propose the idea of a doctrine above the conventions of distinguishing esoteric from exoteric, called the "great perfect teaching" (ichidai engyō). Another great systematizer of esotericism besides Kūkai, the monk Godai'in Annen formalized Tendai esotericism and considered the esoteric to encompass all reality, all places, and all times, as he considered all the Buddhas of the world and their teachings to fall under the category of "esoteric Buddhism" (unlike what his predecessors claimed). Dōhan (12th-13th century) analyzed the diversity of approaches to the Pure Land esotericism of his time.

== Taoism ==
Taoism has a rich history of continuously developing esoteric practices over the centuries, along with the integration of various techniques from other traditions, such as communication with spirits, meditation, body movements, medicine, and "internal alchemy". There are thousands of Taoist texts of an esoteric nature, as in the Daozang compilation (ca. 400) or in the canonical collection of sacred texts of 1444. Its association with esotericism was popularized in the West during the 20th century.

Much of the Taoist religion was derived from native Chinese cosmologies and mantic systems, mainly during the Han dynasty (206 BCE-220), in correlative schemes of Yin and Yang and the "Five Phases" (Wuxing) of the natural world, in macrocosm and microcosm of Heaven (Tian), Earth and Humanity; but also with augury prediction present since the Shang dynasty (such as the I Ching). For a long time these practices were passed on in private groups and were considered revelations, and mantic texts from this time can be considered precursors of Taoist theserae or talismans (fu). Several esotericizing devices can be identified, such as presenting in the text nomenclature as fang (方, "recipes" or "methods"), mi (密, "secret") or jin (禁, "forbidden").

Chinese manuscripts of occult knowledge also circulated - which already constituted since the 3rd and 4th centuries B.C. a separate field of knowledge and popularized a "culture of secrecy" in which, although the texts occasionally prescribed a convention of secrecy, did not necessarily occur; claiming it to be secret promoted the valuation of the knowledge and the manuscript. This culture was widely spread beyond religious specialists. A popular example was the "daybooks", with hemerological content to indicate which days were favorable and unfavorable; hemerology was a constituent part of several types of occult technical literature, as among some Mawangdui manuscripts.

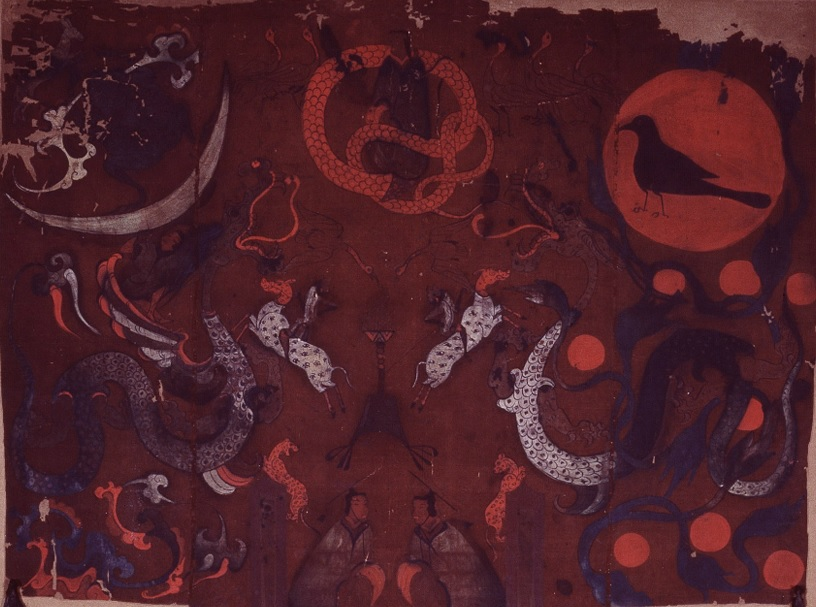
Section of the funerary banner of the Marquise of Dai in her tomb at Mawangdui (163 BC). It represents the ascension to Heaven; the cloth may have served some ritual purpose for the afterlife and immortality.

In addition to the official system of the Five Classics, there was also the unofficial private transmission of other texts at this time, such as those on spiritual transcendence, alchemy, stargazing, immortality, and the Tao. Many experts in these techniques and the Tao were sponsored by the royalties, and were called "masters of recipes" or "magicians", "masters of technique" or "masters of the Tao (fangshi)." They were closely associated with mantic practices, and in the early 2nd century B.C., the Huang-Lao tradition flourished, which associated Laozi with cosmological knowledge and divination around the Yellow Emperor. Unlike Confucian methods, publicly transmitted by the state, these Taoist methods were taught in a secretive manner and sometimes associated with political contestation. Often the fangshi spread esoteric counterparts to the classical texts, which were collectively called "apocryphal" (chenwei), with prophetic messages accessible only to initiates.

Taoist scriptural transmission, in part stemming from the fangshi, was more elaborate than earlier secular counterparts, and one of the earliest descriptions of a grant of magical texts appears in the works of Ge Hong, who received esoteric alchemical works from his master around the year 300.

Their ordination rituals were also highly formalized and esoteric. There was no single investiture to the Taoist priesthood, as there was more than one body of scriptures. By the end of the period of the Northern and Southern dynasties, seven clerical orders were based on seven canons, produced between the years 150 and 500. These orders did not compete with each other and each could grant new titles to the ordained in investiture rituals, which ranged from 3 to 9 days. Each order distinguished itself as a lower or higher degree according to the period. The first effort to define an ecclesiastical and canonical hierarchy was found in the Lingbao scriptures (ca. year 400).

The Shangqing Canon ("Higher Canon of the Purity of the Great Cave") is documented as one of the Taoist revelations that appears to have been the product of ecstasy: between 364 and 370, a group of Perfect Ones reportedly descended to convey scriptures and instructions to Yang Xi in night visions. He and his associates transcribed them, and their records were passed down to a small number of heirs, until they were compiled into a critical edition, Zhengao, around the year 500. By the beginning of the Tang period, it was accepted as the supreme rank in the clergy, considered a superior body to the others and of greater prestige. Because of this, an order was formed to perpetuate this canon, and was the subject of esoteric transmission to an elite, who were initiated into its mysteries in order to achieve individual spiritual perfection.

Women in Taoism were given great importance by the Shangqing school; they had a role as divine teachers, revealers of secrets, and bestowers of esoteric teachings of the Tao, which was actively continued until the Tang dynasty. In contrast to the school of the Way of the Heavenly Masters (Tianshi), the Shangqing regarded rituals of sexual intercourse as of lesser importance, considering that "mixing the qi" and physically harmonizing the Yin and Mahayana did not lead to eternal life. Thus, it viewed women not so much as consorts or sexual partners. During the late imperial period (until the Ming dynasty), they were associated with supernatural connections, healing powers, and shamanic techniques, and powerful female foundresses and priestesses emerged. The female body was also considered essential to the processes of spiritual transformation in later doctrines of internal alchemy.

The Lingbao canon was considered to be the second highest in importance in the ranking. It was seen as sacred because it was supposedly formed spontaneously from primeval forces of the universe and revealed by a very high deity. A recorded example of initiation into this canon was of the two princess daughters of Emperor Ruizong of Tang in 711. Procedures guided by a preceptor are described, who performs transmissions in several stages, among which there is the giving of talismans, the performance of esoteric chanting, and the reading aloud of secret scriptures, some of them about esoteric interpretations of the Tao Te Ching. The liturgies involved a division of space in the four cardinal directions; a center; and a direction to the Perfect Ones, which were associated with energies, stations, items, colors, gates, postures, and choreography. The officiant also invoked spirits, immortals, and the Perfected to participate in the ceremony.

In the Tang period (618-907), Taoist medical practices and prescriptions were well received even in Japan, through Buddhist sutras, as well as methods of divination, such as the astral cult. From the Tang dynasty on, and especially from the Song period on, a new branch of esoteric doctrines and practices called Neidan ("internal alchemy") was developed, whose main characteristic was internal meditation expressed in alchemical language, in addition to the symbolism of the I Ching. They employed a synthesis of various traditions, plus ancient correlative cosmology and terms from the tradition of external alchemy (Waidan), but considered the arrangements of these cosmic emblems to be "images" (xiang) that mediated absolute reality to the mundane. The primordial state to which internal alchemy attempts to return, Non-Existence or Pure Yang, can be represented by the "Golden Elixir".

There are medieval diagrams called "true form charts" (zhengxin tu, 真形圖) that were transmitted privately and used in rituals. They contained aniconic emblems mixed with text, considered the esoteric manifestation of sacred scriptures or the cosmic qi itself condensed at the moment of the creation of the world and reflecting celestial writings. Thus, they were considered the highest sacred scriptures. Its images were supposed to evoke in the practitioner imaginative experiences about interrelationships between body, cosmos or geographical elements, and it was believed that contemplating them could lead to immortality and the inherent truth of the formless Dao. "True form" could also have been a response to competing medieval Buddhist doctrines.

After the An Lushan rebellion, there was more religious openness, but at the same time unaffiliated practitioners of Taoism, supported by local warlords, decided to reshape the Taoist systems. A proliferation of schools of Taoism emerged, with new rites, gods, and initiations into new hierarchical and revelatory traditions. Some began to question the orthodox canons in the Tang dynasty. This intensified later in the Song period. There were innovations such as the one by Du Guangting (850-933), who established a model for rituals to the dead (zhai) and was flexible to the cults of local gods, trying to counter the threats of esoteric Buddhism and popular religions to Taoism. Meanwhile, other conservative Taoist priests attempted to return to the ancient practices of classical rites. Du reports the emergence of rites that would be consolidated later, such as a cult of Xu Xun (292-374), called "Pure Brightness" or "Path of Loyalty and Filiality" (Jingming zhongxiao dao), and therapeutic rites of the Zhang family of Heavenly Masters.

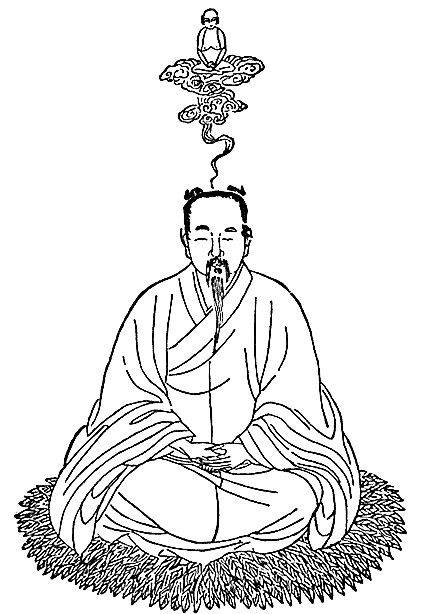
Illustration of the alchemical text The Secret of the Golden Flower, published in the 17th century. It was obtained through the practice of "spirit writing" in 1688 and 1692 by members of the Taoist Jingming dao community (school of "Pure Brightness"), who claimed to have received it from the spirit Xu Xun through intermediaries such as Lü Dongbin, among others. This text was disseminated in the West with the translation by Richard Wilhelm in 1920, with commentary by Carl Jung.

There are also reports from the time of extracanonical rites of exorcism, invocation of souls, and "Rites of Thunder" performed by folk magicians outside the established traditions. There was a large influx of Tantric Buddhism, with Taoists incorporating mudras, mandalas, and internal meditation for merit accumulation and ritual efficacy. In the last two decades of the Northern Song dynasty, there were Heavenly Masters who made elaborate schemes to articulate the powers of thunder, and the Thunder Rites also spread to the Southern Song dynasty, along with practices from the schools of the Golden Elixir, the Divine Empyrean, and the Heart of Heaven. The Emperor and the state would continue to sponsor Taoists seeking spiritual protection.

During the Southern Song dynasty, it was also considered that local gods were under the control of the Tao in the scriptures transmitted in "spirit writing" rituals, for example, following the ancient cult of Xu Xun: his spirit was evoked in 1129 by the cultic leader He Zhengong, and in 1131 he allegedly received secret rites from the spiritual patriarch. The cult of Xu Xun had a revival later in the 13th century. Another Taoicized deity was Wen-ch'ang, God of Literature in rituals, and his supposed revelations in spirit writing indicated multiple reincarnations of him and the instability of the Song dynasty. Taoist cults and practices such as mind rectification continued to be sponsored in the Yuan and Ming dynasties, with state support.

During the Qing period, the practice called "spirit writing" (fuji) was widespread among lay people. It was an oracular technique for channeling communication between the realm of deities, and the devotees who used it were not particularly Taoist, but it still exerted influence on this religion and also changed with its development. The practice became widespread in the 11th century, both among high officials and scholars and among lay people. Scriptures said to be "written by spirits" are found in the Ming Daozang. In the early 17th century, spirit-writing altars (also called "phoenix halls") multiplied in private domestic settings, by small groups headed by literati, devoted to the worship of the immortal Lü Dongbin. These groups were not founded by monks and made a shift from institutionalized religion to personal, local religiosity. There was a network of lay people in various regions who held such a spirit-writing cult and continuously received alleged spiritual texts on self-cultivation and internal alchemy refinement. Pan Yi'an (彭伊安), a 17th-century recipient of the text that in the West came to be translated as The Secret of the Golden Flower, describes his process of initially composing the first part:

From what I remember, it was in the Wu Shen year [1668] that our holy patriarch Chunyang [i.e., Lü] began transmitting the 'Instructions'. No one other than these seven received this transmission. The most profound teaching was [expressed in] no more than one or two words. It could not be put into words and letters. Then the seven questioned the Patriarch in detail. Since our holy Patriarch spared no mercy in clarifying, [their teachings were] compiled for days and months. Eventually, they composed a volume.

The practice became popular in various syncretisms and new sectarian groups in the 19th century. With the establishment of the People's Republic of China in 1949, these communities were seen as "reactionary secret societies," and it was largely abolished.

Taoist methods were influential in the culture of esotericism in Japan, being adapted by Yin-Yang diviners and esoteric Buddhist monks. Talismans and magic were also used in Shinto and Shugendō. Taoist-style astral worship also came into vogue there from the 7th century onward, when emperors were associated with constellations. There was a spread of practical connotations of immortality and books on longevity techniques. Through the esoteric Tendai and Shingon Buddhist doctrines, Chinese practices, and objects such as talismans and magic, rituals for the protection of residences, and other Taoist-inspired beliefs were brought over. In the Heian period, the Chinese administration system was imported, including the creation of a special Yin and Yang Bureau (Inyôryô), which used Yin-Yang cosmology and astrology by officials, to divine fortune. These methods of divination spread to the aristocracy in the 10th century, for personal fortunes and spells of protection against bad luck and dangers, resulting in the practice called inyôdô.

== Confucianism ==
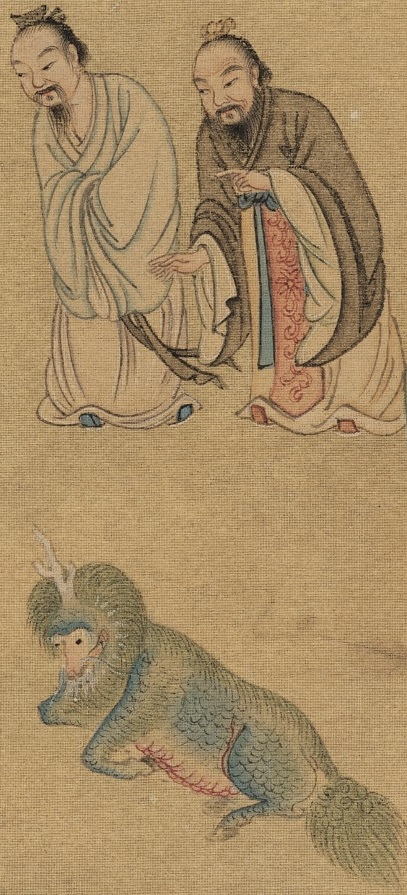
Confucius identifying an auspicious qilin during a hunt with the king of Lu

From the 4th to 3rd centuries BCE, master-disciple lineages that interpreted Confucian texts like the Spring and Autumn Annals beyond the content of historical chronicle, including expanded meanings that would constitute strands of "esoteric classicism" emerged. By the 2nd century B.C., there were interpretative schools that were consolidated by a mainly oral tradition, such as the Gongyang School that claimed to hold the direct secret knowledge transmitted by Confucius to Zixia, which ended up reaching the founder Gongyang Gao. Interpreters of Gongyang considered that Confucius was driven to disguise his message in "esoteric language embodying ultimate principles" ("esoteric sayings and great dogmas, "weiyan dayi") for reasons of an unrealized kingship in his lifetime or because of a lack of power or effectiveness in establishing the Way from his state office. The Gongyang Zhuan ("Gongyang Commentary") is his earliest surviving explanation, originally having been transmitted orally for about three centuries before the Han dynasty until it was consolidated into writing in the second century BCE. In it, sentence by sentence and word by word, the commentary decodes linguistic clues from Confucius' sayings. Thus, the Gongyang School established itself as the source of the most strongly esoteric and eschatological method of reading the Annals.

During the Han dynasty, Confucianism was consolidated as the main religion, but with several strands. Dong Zhongshu (195-105 BCE), a dominant intellectual during the reign of Wu of Han, modeled Han Confucianism after Gongyang's interpretations, promoting a systematization and influencing the production of his canon. He relied on concepts of Yin-Yang cosmology, preordinations, and interpretations of auspices that determined the historical changes and destinies of dynasties. This strand established itself as a state orthodoxy, especially after a canon by Wu and the prophetic use made by Wang Mang. In 136 BCE, Emperor Wu decreed "the abolition of the Hundred Schools of Thought and the supremacy of Confucianism alone." In the 2nd-Ist centuries BCE, Chenwei (讖緯) scriptures appeared: the wei were claimed to complement the classics and to contain their esoteric meaning, while the Chen were oracles and predictions derived from esoteric interpretations. They had political use for prognosticating the rise and fall of dynasties and were employed by the ruling classes. However, the failures of Emperor Wang Mang's tenure led to the discrediting of the Gongyang and the Chenwei. Confucian scholars replaced the then-dominant form of Confucianism with another that became known as the "Old Text School," which was skeptical of the supernatural character of the previous school. By the late Han period (3rd century), the elimination of the esoteric aspects of Confucianism occurred. The Chenwei ceased to be authoritative interpretations of hidden meanings of the classics and was banned in 282 by Emperor Wu of Jin. In 485, Xiaowen ordered the burning of the Chen books. There were other proscriptions over the centuries in later dynasties.

The characteristic of this early Han Confucianism, which became heterodox, was the esoteric combined with a political nature, as a utopian Confucian messianism: the idea of a Golden Age to be realized by an emperor-wise who establishes the cosmic order by self-cultivation of celestial principles. Confucius was also deified as an omniscient prophet who knew what was set to happen, and emperors exploited the superstitions and his alleged prophecies for their own interests. In some apocryphal texts, he appeared as a giant figure with nine heads. One example is the passage in his biography in which the qilin is captured on a hunt: in the Han apocryphal A Confucian Letter Explaining the Secrets of the Annals, this creature serves as an advertisement for political changes and the continuation of Confucian secret teaching even after Confucius' death.

After Lin was captured, the sky rained down the blood that transformed into writing at the main gate of Lu's capital, and that read, 'Prepare the laws quickly, for the sage Confucius will die; Zhou will be destroyed; a comet will appear from the east. The Qin government will arise and suddenly destroy the literary arts. But although the written records will then be dispersed, the teachings of Confucius will not be interrupted.

At the end of the 18th century, esoteric interpretations resurfaced as the "New Text School". Philological in nature, they sought to rescue the classical texts that were no longer orthodox after Wang Mang. It was started by Zhuang Cunyu (1719-1788), a classicist scholar who, in his research, rediscovered the Han exegetical tradition of the Gongyang, which was ignored by philologists of his time. His works remained in obscurity until they were recognized by Liu Fenglu (1776-1829), Song Xiangfeng (1776-1860), Gong Zizhen (1792-1841) and Wei Yuan (1794-1857). These interpretive trends led to practical use in political reformism, culminating in Kang Youwei (1858-1927), who made it a radical interpretation and denounced the bankruptcy of the Qing dynasty government. From the Gongyang writings, which he considered to be the true teachings of Confucius, he applied the notion that humanity moved in a linear direction to a progression of Three Eras: from the Age of Chaos to the Age of Ascending Equality, and then the final Age of Great Unity.

== Islamic esotericism ==
Liana Saif questions the delimitation of "East" and "West" in the matter of esotericism as generating ambiguities, especially concerning the Islamic nations, which considered themselves "West" in the eighth and ninth centuries, in relation to the East of India and China, although Europeans considered them as eastern. In turn, there was a cultural crossover from Buddhism, Hinduism, and Zoroastrianism ("Eastern" on the part of Muslims) that influenced Islamic religious and esoteric practices. Moreover, Islamic cultures from Al-Andalus were called "the West" (Maghreb), while cultures from the Levant to Persia were considered "the East" (Mashriq).

Esoteric Islam developed along with Western philosophy as well as native Arabic practices. There was a cross-fertilization of notions of "esotericism," with the Arabic terms batin and al-ghaib Islam referring to veiled or secret teachings. According to Mark Sedgwick, al-ghaib is the only one of the two terms that appear in the Koran, referring to "meanings and ideas" or discursive concepts, in contrast to batin, which refers to "realities" or objects of content. However, Neoplatonism was largely responsible for developing this concept of esoteric ideas: "Ancient philosophy, and especially Neoplatonism, was also important in developing a large historical body of the Islamic batin discourse including al-ghaib which can, on this basis, be called 'Islamic esotericism'." In turn, this strand of Islamic study was transmitted to the Latin world in the 12th and 13th centuries, and also later in the 19th century. Helmut Zander, however, does not agree that it is possible to refer to either Neoplatonism or batin with the current Western category of "esotericism," and suggests that the dimension of the "secret" is a possibility, but not necessarily present in those other systems that can be called esotericisms.

Due to Orientalism, the concept of "l'ésoterisme islamique" ("islamic esotericism") was coined within the traditionalist school, with a perennialist focus, reducing esoteric Islam almost exclusively to Sufism. This view was greatly influential in the academic studies of Henry Corbin. Because of this, Islamic philosophies such as those of Avicenna and Suhrawardi were incorporated within "Western esotericism" and analyzed according to these limiting categories.

== Early Western reception ==
The earliest Western source to distinguish between exoteric and esoteric Buddhist doctrines was the Sumario de los errores (1556), produced by Jesuits in Japan. From a misinterpretation of the divisions of Buddhist schools and concepts of Zen Buddhism, the work claimed that the Japanese Buddhist clergy preached a "false" doctrine to the lay population (about punishment in Hell and reward in the Pure Land), but that the priests did not believe it, reporting that "the inner core of their law" stated that "there is no soul or life in the hereafter, and that everything ends with this life." It also stated that Buddha's life had passed through stages, and that in a materialistic phase he would have written 9 books, in an exoteric phase 4 books, and finally, in the esoteric phase he produced a single book, in which he considered the previous teachings as merely convenient. This description contributed to the spread in Europe of the "internal doctrine" of Buddhism and subsequently influenced the Western perspective on the philosophy and religion of the East in the 16th and 17th centuries.

Melchior Nunes Barreto was convinced that this dichotomy of a true hidden doctrine and a false external one permeated even the Japanese vocabulary, whereby words could admit both an open public sense and an esoteric sense reserved for the initiates; he realized that the missionaries' ignorance of the hidden sense led to mistakes. In a Catechism of 1586, priest Valignano gave another description of the "internal doctrine" of Buddhism, considering crucial its distinction from the "external doctrine", referring to cultic traditions to deities, such as prayers and ceremonies, and beliefs of Heaven and Hell. In contrast, the "internal doctrine" affirmed a single eternal but non-intelligent principle, alien to the world, and yet identical to everything and to the minds of men, to which it would be possible to join in this life through meditation. Such descriptions were considered principles of "Eastern philosophy" by European interpreters.

João Rodrigues, in the early decades of the 17th century, described the Chinese doctrines of Confucianism, Taoism, and Buddhism from these perspectives and considered that the "external doctrines" would have been conceived by literati and sages "for the people and adapted to their needs (...) for the political administration and peaceful welfare of the people," as opposed to what he called speculative doctrines:

The three sects of the Chinese follow entirely this way of philosophizing. They have two kinds of doctrine. The one they consider true is secret, and only the literates understand it and teach it by employing symbols. The other, vulgar... is considered by the literati to be false in the ordinary sense. They make use of it for divine as well as for civil and fabulous worship, and thus lead the people to good and keep them from evil.

The other method is speculative and deals philosophically with what God is, how this world was made, and everything else related to it. All this doctrine is hidden in various very obscure symbols that only a few people understand. and profess to be the greatest secret.

Until I entered China, our Fathers of China knew practically nothing about this [distinction between external and internal teachings] and about the speculative [internal] doctrine. They knew only about the civil and popular [external] doctrine because there was no one to explain and enlighten them."

Niccolò Longobardo followed Rodrigues' description that an atheistic original philosophy traced to Zoroaster would underlie Greek and Oriental philosophies as a whole, and, in a work from around 1624, regarded the cryptic texts in the East as symptom of "the birth in all nations of two kinds of sciences, one true and secret, and the other false and public."

In general, it was with the emergence of orientalist academic studies in the 17th and 18th centuries that there was a great sedimentation of the category of esotericism in a comparative manner in relation to Persian, Arabic, Indian and Chinese texts and practices. Abraham Rogerius wrote an influential work in 1651 in which he referred to "occult paganism" among Indians. Johann Jakob Brucker would reference the "esoteric doctrine of Buddha or Foë". This discourse about the presence of esotericism in the East had then become current, found in several works and authors, such as Johann Friedrich Cotta, Michael Hißmann, Friedrich Schlegel, the Encyclopédie (1756) and others.

Leibniz advocated for Agostino Steuco's concept of "perennial philosophy", that there would be a universal source present in all religious traditions, and took an interest in Chinese systems in his correspondence with the Jesuit Joachim Bouvet, who was sent on the first French mission to China. Bouvet, in his letters, also considered Chinese religion from a Western esoteric perspective as if it were a "prisca theologia" and "hermeticism," with the belief that the Chinese would possess eternal wisdom of Creation from before the Flood. In 1700, he described the I Ching as containing: "many precious remains of the debris of the most ancient and excellent philosophy taught by the first Patriarchs of the world to their descendants, since corrupted and almost entirely obscured by the course of time." John Toland in 1720 would affirm what is today called "esoteric distinction" as being a universal phenomenon, present not only in the West but also in several Eastern peoples.

Emanuel Swedenborg refers to an "Old Church" originating from lost teachings about the "pure correspondences", whose language reflects, according to his system, hidden spiritual realities. He points out that the remnant of this "Old Church" would be in China, or among the "Tartars" in the "Great Tartary". This, in addition to vague references to Chinese and Indians in Yogic postures, raised conjectures by late 19th century theosophists, as well as by late 20th and early 21st centuries scholars that Swedenborg was referring to Tibet or Siberia, or that he knew about esoteric Buddhism from contacts and trade routes, as well as the similarity of his esoteric practices with Asian counterparts. The reception of Swedenborg's mystical works translated into Japan and the literary speculations of Western esotericism of the late 19th and early 20th centuries also influenced exponents of modern Asian Buddhism.

Notions that a "pre-Kabbalah" was found in a Chinese or Asian Revelation before the Jewish one was proposed by James Parsons and assimilated in Scottish Masonic circles, with a major diffuser of this being Andrew Michael Ramsay in his book The Philosophical Principles of Natural and Revealed Religion (1748-49).

A posthumous essay by Michel-Ange-André Le Roux Deshauterayes described in its first part the "esoteric doctrine" of Buddhism; it was read by Schopenhauer in 1826, who was greatly influenced by the work.

Abel Rémusat and Brian Houghton Hodgson identified what they called the "esoteric Buddhism" of Nepal, Tibet and China as a distinct and non-atheistic doctrine, as it affirmed an intelligent first principle called the Adi-Buddha; they noted that there was an internal categorization of texts called Tantra/Upadesha as an esoteric one. Horace H. Wilson in 1832 also focused on this esoteric Buddhist doctrine. In 1827, Henry Colebrooke discussed the "esoteric brāhmana".

In the book Isis Unveiled (1877), Helena Blavatsky attempted, according to Devin Zuber, to "incorporate every conceivable aspect" of "Eastern and Western esotericisms." She also wrote that Swedenborg had a Revelation of Buddhist and Hindu esoteric teachings from Tibet. Another important book in the theosophical society context was Esoteric Buddhism (1883) by Alfred Percy Sinnett. Max Müller repudiated the Theosophists' claims of the existence of an "esoteric Buddhism" or esoteric Indian doctrines.

== See also ==
- Western esotericism
