= Transcultural =

Transcultural may refer to:

- Transcultural psychiatry, also known as Cross-cultural psychiatry
- Transculturation, the phenomenon of merging and converging cultures
- Transculturalism
- Trans-cultural diffusion
