= Dagmar Reichardt =

German cultural scholar (born 1961)

Dagmar Reichardt (born 25 September 1961 in Rome, Italy) is a leading German scholar in the area of transcultural studies.

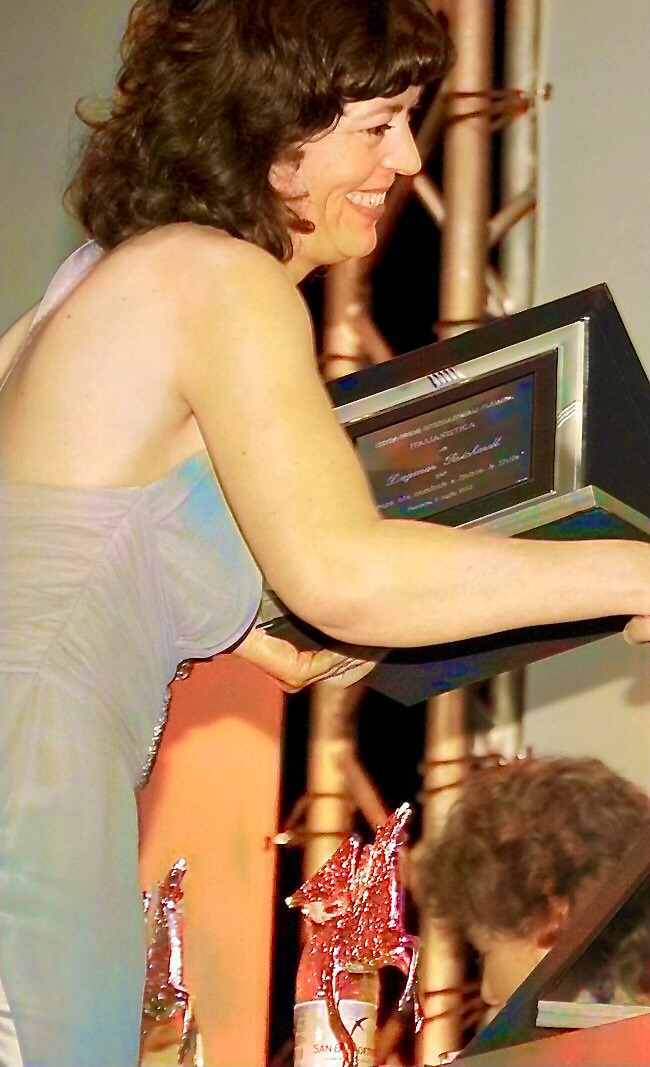
Dagmar Reichardt in 2007 during the ceremony of the 34. Flaiano International Prize for Italian Studies

== Life ==
Dagmar Reichardt descends from a German Huguenot family with roots extending far back in time, the first documented Renaissance family crest of the Reichardt's being located in the cathedral St. Georg of Nördlingen, Bavaria, showing the then-mayor of Nördlingen Kilian Reichart (died in AD 1577) as first ancestor. The House's later branches include German composer and music critic Johann Friedrich Reichardt (1752–1814), as its most prominent cultural representative who appeared in Königsberg, Halle and at the courts of three Prussian kings in Berlin and Potsdam. With the Poet's Paradise Garden in Giebichenstein (Giebichensteiner Dichterparadies), which was also called Home of the Romantics (Herberge der Romantik) or Reichardt's Garden (Reichardts Garten) he created a meeting place for scientists and literary personalities of his time. He was close to the philosopher of the German Enlightenment Immanuel Kant during his years of study in Königsberg, engaged in correspondence with his friend Johann Wolfgang von Goethe and set the latter's poems to music (Kunstlied), as he also did for Johann Gottfried Herder and August Heinrich Hoffmann von Fallersleben. Among other cultural activities, Johann Friedrich Reichardt went on several trips to Italy and published the Frankreich (France) journal in 1795, followed by the cultural-political journal Deutschland (Germany) in 1796.

Reichardt's extended family includes not only the authors Ludwig Tieck, Heinrich von Kleist, a native of Frankfurt/Oder, and the historic Huguenot family De Pourtalès, but also the Silesian poet Hermann Isaac Emil von Petit (9 June 1811 – 30 January 1864; also called Hermann de Petit). Von Petit, who was the son of a lieutenant in the regiment of Malschitzky and a French Protestant refugee (Réfugié), worked in the Silesian town of Brieg (now Brzeg, Poland) and was the author of the volume Poems: My Whole Wealth Is My Song (Gedichte. Mein ganzer Reichtum ist mein Lied, 1857) that is archived in the library of the Brieg museum. He also taught French, English, Italian, and Spanish, and published educational textbooks for these languages. Of these, especially his Practical Course for Learning the Italian Language (Praktischer Lehrgang zur Erlernung die italienischen Sprache, 1862 in its 3rd edition) and Indispensable Interpreter for Germans Who Travel to France, Especially Those Who Want to Visit the Paris Industrial Exhibition (Unentbehrlicher Dolmetscher für Deutsche, die nach Frankreich reisen, insbesondere für diejenigen, welche die Pariser Industrie-Ausstellung besuchen wollen), published on the occasion of the first major Paris Industrial Exhibition in 1855, have survived to this day. His volume of Festival Poems for Children (Festgedichte für Kinder, 1857) contained verses in German, French, English, Italian, and Spanish. In 1853, he published a weekly Brieg newspaper under the title of Jest and Seriousness (Scherz und Ernst), which contained essays, poems, and epigrams related to literature and history by various writers.

Dagmar Reichardt grew up as the daughter of a German diplomat in Santiago de Chile and Rome before she started her international academic career in Germany. From 1986 to 1989, she co-founded, published, and edited the German-Italian culture magazine Zigzag: The Italian Magazine (Zigzag. Das Italien-Magazin) in cooperation with the Institute of Political Science at the University of Hamburg. In Hamburg, she also directed the creative writing workshop with the onomatopoetic German title Reiters Ruhm (Rider's Renown) by the Writers' Room e.V. from 1999 to 2009 and worked as a translator, book editor, ghostwriter, and freelance author. During this time, she edited literary books such as Neuere Deutsche Literatur (Newer German Literature, 1991; 1992), as well as an anthology by the Italian scholar of German literature Cesare Cases in German translation (1996). These were followed by additional literary translations (from Italian and English language into German) and critical editions, including the book of poetry Himmelsreden (Heavenly Speeches, 2004) by Giuseppe Bonaviri, the film script Der heilige Paulus (Saint Paul, 2007; with a foreword by Dacia Maraini) by Pier Paolo Pasolini, as well as music editions by Etta Scollo (2014) or Marco Basley (2014) and short texts by Ennio Morricone (2019), Igiaba Scego (2020), Iain Chambers (2020) and Dacia Maraini (2007 and 2020). Reichardt authored more than 200 publications, among them over 130 academic publications and, alone during the years 1987–2004, over 50 books of fiction and non-fiction on the German book market for which she was responsible, publishing and editing them as a freelance chief-lector, translator, and ghostwriter.

== Academic career ==
After a first period of study in New York City/USA (1980–1981), Dagmar Reichardt studied Art History, philosophy, Contemporary German Literature, and Romance Studies, at the universities of Frankfurt am Main/Germany, Urbino/Italy, and Hamburg/Germany. In 1989, she earned her master's degree in Linguistic Science with a thesis on the northern Italian author Guido Piovene (1907–1974). She received her PhD on the Sicilian writer Giuseppe Bonaviri (1924–2009) in 1999 with highest honors, both at the University of Hamburg. Her studies on Sicily were subsequently expanded with an extensive project on the cultural hybridity and transculturality of Sicilian island literature, which led to the publication of the interdisciplinary, trilingual volume of L'Europa che comincia e finisce: la Sicilia (2006). The work received buoyant reviews in the international research scene and met with a very positive reception. Thus, the Sicilian journalist and writer Giuseppe Quatriglio considered this to be "a remarkable study […] with undoubtedly meritorious and complex research results" (Giornale di Sicilia, 7 April 2006), while the Italian literature critic Sergio Sciacca honored it as "an exceptionally original work […] and a significant step toward the cultural design of a "New Europe" (La Sicilia, 21 July 2006) and the German scholar Christoph Schamm certifies in the online-journal IASL i.a. the historical "outstanding significance that moving from the island to continental Italy" had to Sicilian travelers according to some statements in Reichardt's collection. The Spanish Italianist Paulino Matas Gil assessed the volume simply as "mandatory reading for international Italian studies" (Revista de la Sociedad Española de Italianistas, 2005/3, p. 192). One year after the book's release, Dagmar Reichardt was awarded the Flaiano International Prize for Italian studies in 2007.

Following her years as a Lecturer and Assistant Professor for Romance Studies at the universities of Hamburg (1997–2003) and Bremen (2001–2008), as well as visiting professor in Innsbruck/Austria (2008), Reichardt was professor for Modern Italian Studies at the Faculty of Arts at the University of Groningen/The Netherlands from 2008 until 2012, and then Head of Italian Studies and member of the chair group for European Languages and Cultures at the same Faculty (2012–2016). In 2015 she was appointed to the Chair of Media Industry in the Master and PhD degree program for International Cultural and Media Management at the Latvian Academy of Culture in Riga, Latvia. In addition, she had been actively involved as a member of various academic associations in Germany, Italy, Austria, Switzerland, the Benelux, and the USA. She served and still serves on the academic advisory boards of the Premio Flaiano (2001–2006), the International Association of Italian University Professors AIPI (since 2006), and Austrian-Canadian Society (since 2007). Since 2012, she self-initiated, (co-) organized and (co-) directed more than 15 international conferences and/or research panels within world congresses. Moreover, since 2013, Reichardt volunteers as President of the Swiss foundation Fondation Erica Sauter – FES, registered in Geneva, Switzerland. In 2005 and 2007, she worked as a representative of Germany to coordinate various European projects as honorary member of a collaborative scientific board of the foundation Fondazione Salvatore Quasimodo, that published under the auspices of the Italian Cultural Institute in Budapest two collections of new European poets (2005) and young European authors and playwrights (2007, 2 voll.). In 2005/06, she coordinated for Germany the literary-park-project The Book of Stone (Il libro di pietra) by the writer Giuseppe Bonaviri in Arpino/Italy together with the Italian Foreign Ministry and the German poet Matthias Politycki, one of the writers who she had introduced to Italy. On this occasion, she was distinguished with the Cicero Medal of Lazio within the scope of the XXV Certamen Ciceronianum.

In 2015 Reichardt was the first Italian scholar who followed the literary production written in Italian language by Jhumpa Lahiri on an international level, starting to publish several essays in 2017. Further topics were treated in the following collections on Italian literature and cinema (Letteratura e cinema, 2014), Italian fashion (Moda Made in Italy, 2016), the Sicilian classical writer Giovanni Verga (Verga innovatore / Innovative Verga, 2017), the history of Italian migration in postmodern times (Italia transculturale, 2018), and the transdisciplinary principle of polyphony in the Italian history of music (Polifonia musicale, 2020). Dagmar Reichardt produced numerous further publications in the domains of Comparative Literary and Cultural Management, as well as Contemporary Romance studies and European Studies with a focus on politico-cultural theories and topics. In terms of methodology, Reichardt primarily engages in a critical discussion of transculturalism, sociological and literary power discourses, as well as in Comparative studies regarding regional, national, and global identities with a focus on contemporary European and Global Studies.

== Main areas of research ==
■ Transcultural Studies

■ Post-structuralism and Postcolonialism

■ Discourse analyses (particularly governance, globalization and intermedia discourses)

■ Media and Cultural Management

■ Digital Humanities and the Cultural Digital Market

■ Comparative European Studies, 19th – 21st century, Migration Studies

■ Comparative, narratological, and imagological approaches: word-image-relations

■ Sociology of Literature and Production Aesthetics
