= Gregory B. Lee =

British sinologist (born 1955)

- 利大英 (Lì Dàyīng)
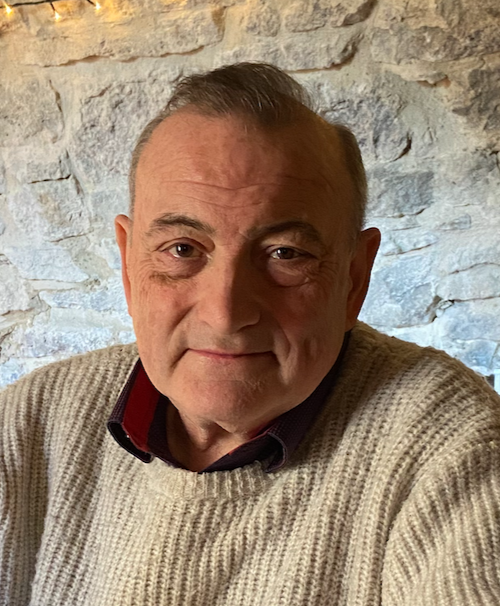
- Lee in 2025
- Born: 1955 (age 70–71); Liverpool, UK
- Occupations: Academic, author, broadcaster
- Known for: Sinologist
- Children: 2
- Awards: French Order of Academic Palms; Fellow of the Hong Kong Academy of the Humanities

Academic background
- Education: Liverpool Collegiate School
- Alma mater: SOAS University of London (BA, PhD); Peking University

Academic work
- Discipline: Chinese cultural studies
- Institutions: University of Cambridge; SOAS, University of London; University of Chicago; University of Hong Kong; City University of Hong Kong; University of Lyon
- Main interests: Chinese and comparative literary and cultural studies

Gregory B. Lee (born 1955) is a writer and academic. Lee was Founding Professor of Chinese Studies at the University of St Andrews where he is now Emeritus Professor. He was until July 2020, Director of the French research Institute for Transtextual and Transcultural Studies based at Jean Moulin University Lyon 3 where he is Professeur émérite (Emeritus professor). Lee was previously Chair Professor of Chinese and Transcultural Studies and Dean of the College of Liberal Arts and Social Sciences at the City University of Hong Kong. From 2007 to 2010 Lee was First Vice-President (Research) of Jean Moulin University Lyon 3. In 2010, Lee was made a Chevalier in the French Order of Academic Palms. In 2011, he was elected Fellow of the Hong Kong Academy of the Humanities.

== Academic career ==
Lee received his undergraduate degree in modern and classical Chinese at the University of London's School of Oriental and African Studies (SOAS) in 1979, and his PhD in Chinese poetry from the same institution in 1985. He also studied political economy and Chinese literature at Peking University (1979–83) as a British Council Scholar, and held a British Academy Postdoctoral Fellowship (1985–86) at the Chinese Academy of Social Sciences's Institute of Literature, whose then director was Liu Zaifu.

Lee formerly taught in the United Kingdom at the University of Cambridge (1983–1984) and the School of Oriental and African Studies (1987–1988), before occupying posts as an assistant professor in East Asian Languages and Civilizations at the University of Chicago (1990–1994) and associate professor at the University of Hong Kong (1994–1998), where he taught comparative literature. A specialist in Chinese and comparative literary and cultural studies, his more recent work is in comparative cultural history, specifically in the fields of Chinese diaspora, transcultural studies, and intellectual decolonization. He joined the University of Lyon in 1998.

== Writings ==
Lee's dual-language biographical novel 第八位中國商人同消失咗嘅海員／The Eighth Chinese Merchant and the Disappeared Seamen was published in 2022 by Hong Kong's Typesetter Publishing .

Lee's first book Dai Wangshu : The Life and Poetry of a Chinese Modernist, The Chinese University of Hong Kong Press (1985), analysed the work and career of the modern Chinese poet Dai Wangshu. His second book, Troubadours, Trumpeters, Troubled Makers: Lyricism, Nationalism and Hybridity in China and Its Others (C. Hurst & Co. and Duke University Press, 1996), discusses the controversy surrounding the "Chineseness" of modern Chinese writers following the 1989 Tiananmen Square protests. His third book was Chinas Unlimited: Making the Imaginaries of China and Chineseness (Routledge and Hawai'i UP, 2003). His China's Lost Decade: The Politics and Poetics of the 1980s (Tigre de Papier, 2009; 2011) was republished as a revised edition in 2012 by Zephyr Press. His Un Spectre hante la Chine : Les fondements de la contestation actuelle was published in April 2012 (Tigre de Papier, 2009; 2011). Lee's China Imagined: From European Fantasy to Spectacular Power was published in 2018 by C. Hurst & Co.

== Other professional activities ==
Lee has also been a radio broadcaster on China and the Chinese diaspora. In 2005 he wrote and presented BBC Radio 3's Sunday Feature "Liver Birds and Laundrymen" in which he revisited the story of Europe's oldest Chinatown, in Liverpool (UK), and interrogated dominant British perceptions of the Chinese. He has also translated a variety of Chinese works, including those of contemporary poet Duo Duo (Looking Out From Death Bloomsbury, 1989; The Boy Who Catches Wasps Zephyr, 2002), Dai Wangshu, and Nobel laureate Gao Xingjian ("Fugitives", a controversial 1989 play). Duo Duo was awarded the 2010 World Literature Today's Neustadt International Prize for Literature.

An online archive – The G. B. Lee Archive – features his lectures, talks, interviews, podcasts, and film clips from the 1980s.

Lee is the General Editor of the journal Transtext(e)s-Transcultures.
