= Transculturalism =

Concept about multi-culturalism

Transculturalism is defined as "seeing oneself in the other". Transcultural is in turn described as "extending through all human cultures" or "involving, encompassing, or combining elements of more than one culture".

== Other definitions ==
In 1940, transculturalism was originally defined by Fernando Ortiz, a Cuban scholar, based on the article Nuestra America (1881) by José Marti. From Marti Gra's idea, Ortiz thought that transculturalism was the key in legitimizing the [hemispheric] identity. Thus Ortiz defined transculturalism as the synthesis of two phases occurring simultaneously, one being a deculturalization of the past with a métissage (see métis, as in the Métis population of Canada and the United States) with the present, which further means the "reinventing of the new common culture". Such reinvention of a new common culture is in turn based on the meeting and intermingling of the different peoples and cultures. According to Lamberto Tassinari, the director of Vice Versa, a transcultural magazine in Montreal, Quebec, Canada, transculturalism is a new form of humanism based on the idea of relinquishing the strong traditional identities and cultures which [...] were [the] products of imperialistic empires [...] interspersed with dogmatic religious values. Tassinari further declared that transculturalism opposes the singular traditional cultures that evolved from the nation-state. He also stated that transculturalism is based on the breaking down of boundaries, and is contrary to multiculturalism because in the latter most experiences that have shown [reinforces] boundaries based on past cultural heritages. And that in transculturalism the concept of culture is at the center of the nation-state or the disappearance of the nationstate itself. In this context, German cultural scholar Dagmar Reichardt stresses the didactical relevance of a paradigmatic shift in academia through Transcultural Studies, mainly focusing on the European model of conviviality in a globalized world focusing on French didactics and on Italian culture.

Another source of transculturalism is the work of American and Russian critical thinker Mikhail Epstein, beginning in 1982, and later supported by Ellen Berry, Arianna Dagnino, Slobodanka Vladiv–Glover and others. The theory of transculture is developed in Mikhail Epstein's book After the Future: The Paradoxes of Postmodernism and Contemporary Russian Culture (Amherst: The University of Massachusetts Press, 1995, 392 pp.) and especially in Mikhail Epstein's and Ellen Berry's book Transcultural Experiments: Russian and American Models of Creative Communication (New York: Palgrave MacMillan, 1999, 340 pp.; of 23 chapters, 16 are written by M. Epstein). Within a comparative literary context, the theory of the transcultural is further developed by Dagnino in her book Transcultural Writers and Novels in the Age of Global Mobility (West Lafayette: Purdue University Press, 2015, 240 pp).

== Characteristics ==
According to Richard Slimbach, author of The Transcultural Journey, transculturalism is rooted in the pursuit to define shared interests and common values across cultural and national borders. Slimbach further stated that transculturalism can be tested by means of thinking "outside the box of one's motherland" and by "seeing many sides of every question without abandoning conviction, and allowing for a chameleon sense of self without losing one's cultural center".

According to Jeff Lewis, transculturalism is characterised by cultural fluidity and the dynamics of cultural change. Whether by conflict, necessity, revolution or the slow progress of interaction, different groups share their stories, symbols, values, meanings and experiences. This process of sharing and perpetual 'beaching' releases the solidity and stability of culture, creating the condition for transfer and transition. More than simple 'multiculturalism', which seeks to solidify difference as ontology, 'transculturalism' acknowledges the uneven interspersion of Difference and Sameness. It allows human individuals groups to adapt and adopt new discourses, values, ideas and knowledge systems. It acknowledges that culture is always in a state of flux, and always seeking new terrains of knowing and being.

Transculturalism is the mobilization of the definition of culture through the expression and deployment of new forms of cultural politics. Based on Jeff Lewis’ From Culturalism to Transculturalism, transculturalism is charactized by the following:

- Transculturalism emphasizes on the problematics of contemporary culture in terms of relationships, meaning-making, and power formation; and the transitory nature of culture as well as its power to transform.
- Transculturalism is interested in dissonance, tension, and instability as it is with the stabilizing effects of social conjunction, communalism, and organization; and in the destabilizing effects of non-meaning or meaning atrophy. It is interested in the disintegration of groups, cultures, and power.
- Transculturalism seeks to illuminate the various gradients of culture and the ways in which social groups create and distribute their meanings; and the ways in which social groups interact and experience tension.
- Transculturalism looks toward the ways in which language wars are historically shaped and conducted.
- Transculturalism does not seek to privilege the semiotic over the material conditions of life, nor vice versa.
- Transculturalism accepts that language and materiality continually interact within an unstable locus of specific historical conditions.
- Transculturalism locates relationships of power in terms of language and history.
- Transculturalism is deeply suspicious of itself and of all utterances. Its claim to knowledge is always redoubtable, self-reflexive, and self-critical.
- Transculturalism can never eschew the force of its own precepts and the dynamic that is culture.
- Transculturalism never sides with one moral perspective over another but endeavors to examine them without ruling out moral relativism or meta-ethical confluence.

== Transculturing in film theory ==
Within the field of film theory/film analysis, transculturing is the adaptation of a literary work into historically and culturally colonised contexts before being transformed into something new. For example, Akira Kurosawa's Throne of Blood (1957) recontextualised Macbeth (written in the early 17th century) to the Japanese civil war of the 15th century.

== See also ==
- Transculture
- Transculturation
- Transcultural psychiatry
- Transcultural nursing
- Cosmopolitanism
- Cultural universal
- Culturology
- Third culture kid
- Institute for Transtextual and Transcultural Studies
- Diaspora studies
- Transcultural diffusion
- Center for Transcultural Studies
