= Institute for Transtextual and Transcultural Studies =

Facility in Lyon

The IETT, the Institute for Transtextual and Transcultural Studies (French: Institut d'études transtextuelles et transculturelles (IETT)), is a publicly funded research institute based in Lyon, France, and attached to the Jean Moulin University Lyon 3. It is a constituent unit of the Maison des Sciences de l'Homme Lyon St-Étienne. Its research focuses on analysis of how the world was conceived from colonialist relations, on notions of gender, and on techno-economic ideologies. Its current director is Gregory B. Lee, its deputy directors are Florence Labaune-Demeule and Sophie Coavoux.

The IETT represents Jean Moulin University Lyon 3 within the French Network for Asian Studies (GIS Asie), and the Institut du Genre. The IETT is a founding member of Europe in a Networked World (E-NeW), and of EastAsiaNet. The IETT publishes the multilingual blind peer-reviewed academic journal Transtext(e)s-Transcultures: A Journal of Global Cultural Studies.
