= Michael Hissmann =

German philosopher (1752–1784)

Michael Hissmann (1752, Hermannstadt – 1784, Göttingen) was a German philosopher, an advocate of French sensualism, and a radical materialist who translated Condillac, Charles de Brosses, and Joseph Priestley into German.

Hissmann studied philosophy at Erlangen and Göttingen. From 1778 to 1783 he edited the Magazin für die Philosophie und ihre Geschichte. He became an extraordinary professor at Göttingen in 1782, and a full professor in 1784.

== Selected works ==
- De Infinito, 1776
- Geschichte der Lehre von der Association der Ideen, 1776.
- Psychologische Versuche, ein Beytrag zur esoterischen Logik, 1777.
- Anleitung zur Kenntniß der auserlesenen Literatur in allen Theilen der Philosophie, 1778.
- Briefe über Gegenstände der Philosophie, 1778.
- Magazin für die Philosophie und ihre Geschichte, 6 volumes, 1778–83.
- Untersuchungen über den Stand der Natur, 1780.
- Vesuch über das Leben des Freyhernn von Leibnitz, 1783.
- Ausgewählte Schriften, edited by Udo Roth und Gideon Stiening, Berlin 2013.
