= Sarada Tilaka =

Sarada Tilaka or Sharada Tilak (Sanskrit: Śaradatilaka) a collection of mantras and instructions for worship (Homa) of various deities including Ganapati, Shiva, Vishnu and various manifestations of the goddess. It was compiled circa 800 AD by Sri Lakshmana Desikendra believed to be a native of Nasik in Maharashtra.

The term 'Sarada Tilaka' means the tilaka of Sarada (the goddess Saraswati), and the text deals with the tantra system of worship. Topics including Tantra Swaroopa, Tantrik Prakriya, Mantrotpatti, Yogavidya etc. are explained in detail in 25 chapters of verses.
