= Tehwildar =

Tehwildars in the Mughal court, were the female financial officers assigned to the zenana.

The majority of the consolidation of Mughal court etiquette occurred under the reign of Emperor Akbar. Differing accounts of the size of his harem range anywhere from 300 to 5,000 wives. Residing within the zenana were also eunuchs, concubines, members of the royal household, servants, and entertainers, all of which comprised a massive community within itself. As such, the necessity for organizing the administration of zenana life led to the creation of several official posts within the harem.

Among these positions was the Tehwildar. Described as the "lady accounts officer and cashier to whom all officials, including daroghas, had to apply for their salaries," she was responsible for all of the financial transactions related to the zenana and its residents. The disbursement of salaries may have been the primary responsibility of the cash-keeper. However, other duties included the administration of allowances to the royal women. All requests of funds were first sent to the Tehwildar for approval. She then wrote a memorandum to the applicant who approved her official document. Afterward the treasury minister would release the funds in cash.

== See also ==
- Zenana
- Mughal Harem
- Darogha
- Mahaldar
