= The Mughal Harem =

1988 book by K. S. Lal

- Author: K. S. Lal
- Subject: Mughal Harem
- Genre: Non fiction
- Publication date: 1988
- ISBN: 978-8185179032

The Mughal Harem is a book by historian K.S. Lal published in 1988 about the Mughal Harem. The book has been praised for its description of the harem's internal dynamics, but has also been criticized for focusing on the sexual role of the harem and as anti-Muslim propaganda.

== Contents ==
Based on contemporary sources, Lal studies queens, princesses, dancing girls, and slaves who belonged to Mughal harem from 15th to 18th century. The political roles of Nur Jahan, Jahanara and Roshanara are described in detail. The ladies were kept beside lawfully wedded wives for the sole purpose of sexual enjoyment by the Mughal emperors. Moreover, no one was allowed to enter the harem except the emperor himself which primarily created the dearth of physical evidence. Women played a vital role in the Mughal dynasty due to the diverse religio-political society of India. Additionally, women were used to exchange as a gift by the Mughal emperors.

== Summary ==
The book commences with an examination of the sources utilized to conduct a detailed analysis of the Mughal harem across different reigns. These sources range from memoirs penned by contemporary writers and visitors of the Mughal court to artworks of the era and originate from both native Indian and European perspectives .

The second chapter delves into the establishment of the harem by Akbar and its subsequent perpetuation under his successors. Subsequent chapters center on the palaces inhabited by the harem members, detailing the laccommodations and amenities at their disposal. The book explores the process by which women were recruited into the harem, their influence on cultural affairs within the palaces, and their impact on the lives of princes and princesses. It also discusses the garden parties organized by these women and their wealth and sway over various Mughal rulers.

In later chapters, the book examines the lifestyles pursued by Mughal emperors and the harem residents, emphasizing their involvement in pleasure-seeking activities. Finally, the narrative culminates in an exploration of the moral deterioration precipitated by this institution and its role in the eventual downfall of the Mughal empire. The internal strife among princes, fueled by the influence of these women, is highlighted as a major contributing factor to the empire's decline.

== Reception ==
"The Mughal Harem" has been lauded as a seminal work for its comprehensive exploration of the harem's dynamics, which had been marginalized in historical discourse. However, it has also been criticized as biased against Muslim rule in India. Many scholars contend that this book diminishes the role women played in the empire to merely that of concubines, despite their substantial contributions in various positions.

A. Jan Qaiser of Aligarh Muslim University was very dismissive of the book. Ruby Lal noted Lal's work to be one of the few academic accounts on the topic but laden with oriental tropes of sexuality and seclusion. Karuna Sharma shared Ruby Lal's concerns; K. S. Lal's was the first comprehensive study of the subject but it exoticized the Harem and failed to account for members, who did not have any sexual role. Gianna Carotenuto found the work to be laced with "salacious tales and the sexy exploits of mythic heroes and heroines"; Lal's approach was intended to reinforce the oriental reputation of harem as a haven of sexual extremes and intrigues, and his laments about the evils of Harem being siphoned onto the society were reflective of personal and political agendas.

Indrani Chatterjee remarked of Lal to have treated of Muslims as a "hermetically sealed" category, thereby producing a communalised historiography in pursuit of a political agenda. Harbans Mukhia found Lal's account descriptive but stereotypical. In a review of another work of Lal for the Bulletin of the School of Oriental & African Studies, A. A. Powell noted his conclusion about the Mughals being responsible for religious persecution and socioeconomic exploitation of Hindus to have been in tune with his recent publications including The Mughal Harem. Irfan Habib concured with the assessment of Chatterjee and Powell.

Despite these criticisms, the claims made in the book have been corroborated by other scholars, lending credibility to its assertions. Notably, the book establishes that the Mughal harem was indeed instituted by Emperor Akbar, a detail that has been verified by various historians and scholars. However, the strangers and European travelers are not authentic or credible sources due to their little understanding of the cultural aspects of India and Muslims.

Furthermore, numerous other scholars have contributed to the discourse by critically examining the perspectives of historians and travelers who documented their encounters with the Mughal emperors and their empires. Additionally, an essential aspect of this debate involves exploring the cultural and religious comprehension of Islam by those who have studied the institution of the harem.
