= Mughal Harem =

Women's quarters in the Mughal court

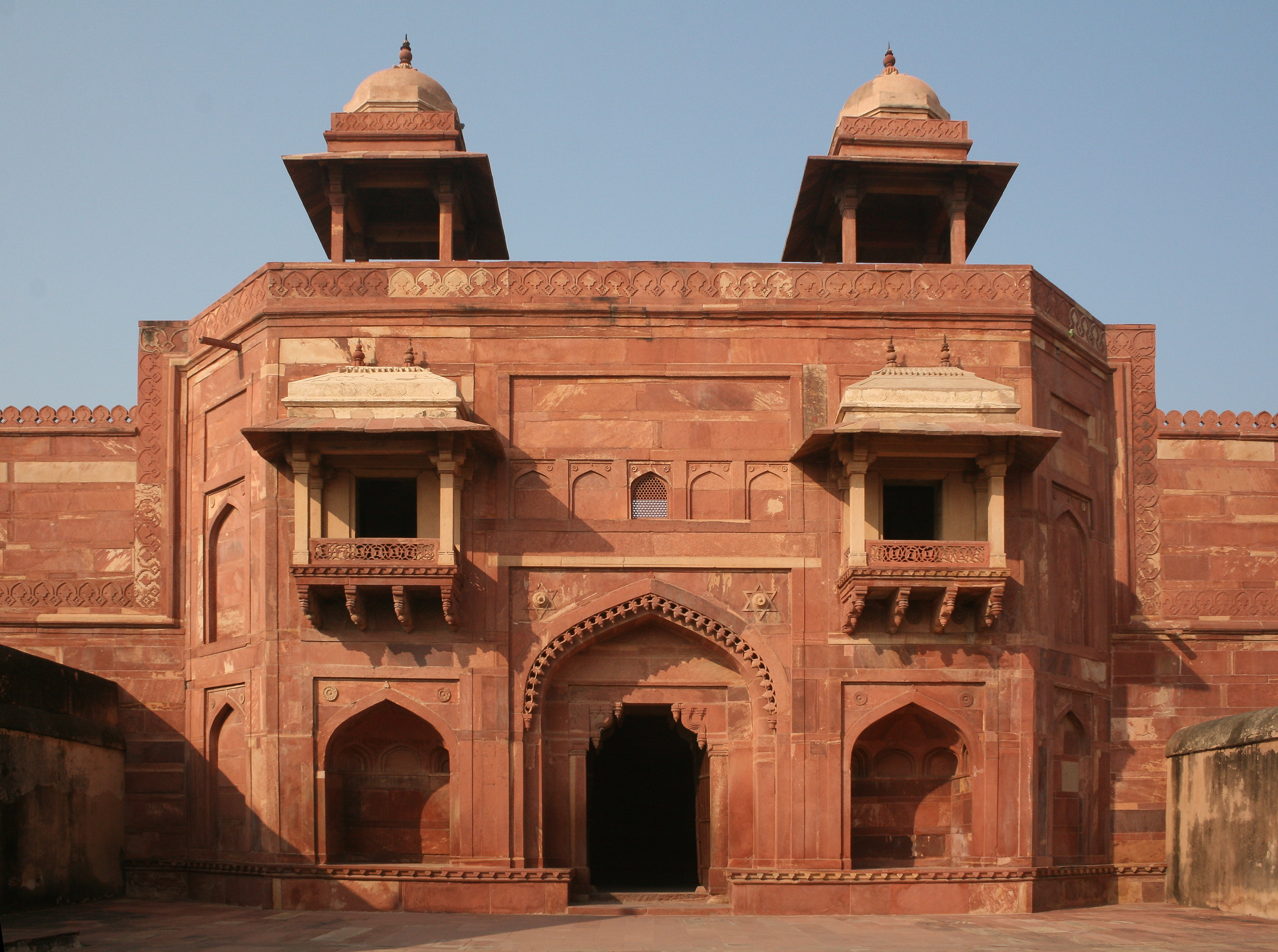
Entrance to the Jodha Bai Mahal in the harem at the Mughal city of Fatehpur Sikri

The Mughal Harem was the harem of Mughal emperors of the Indian subcontinent. The term originated with the Near East, meaning a "forbidden place; sacrosanct, sanctum", and etymologically related to the Arabic حريم ḥarīm, "a sacred inviolable place; female members of the family" and حرام ḥarām, "forbidden; sacred". It has the same meaning as the Turkish word seraglio and the Persian word zenana. It is also similar to the Sanskrit word anthapura, meaning ‘the inner apartment’ of the household. It came to mean the sphere of women in what was usually a polygynous household and their segregated quarters which were forbidden to men.

The harem, being a forbidden place, was constant topic of speculation and curiosity. It was a vibrant and large physical space where women were arranged in regard to their proximity to the emperor.

== History ==
=== The women ===
Harem women were composed of consorts (wives and slave concubines), female relatives of the Mughals emperors and slave maids. Most women usually entered the harem through marriage, birth, appointments or as gifts (slaves).

The women were governed through strict rules of Purdah, and they could not move out of the harem as they liked, but many women travelled for affairs of pilgrimage to local shrines, hunting and sightseeing with the emperor. Inside the harem, they led a luxurious and comfortable life.

The harem had gardens, fountains and water channels attached to it. Various departments within the Mughal Harem fulfilled the basic needs of its residents. The food was provided from the royal kitchen, known as Bawarchikhana, and the Akbar Khanah provided drinking water and wine. The Ritab Khanah was in charge of supplying bread and the Maywa Khanah provided fruits to the household. Things of personal use such as dresses, jewellery, fancy articles and other household items were provided by the Imperial Karkhanah.

== Hierarchy ==
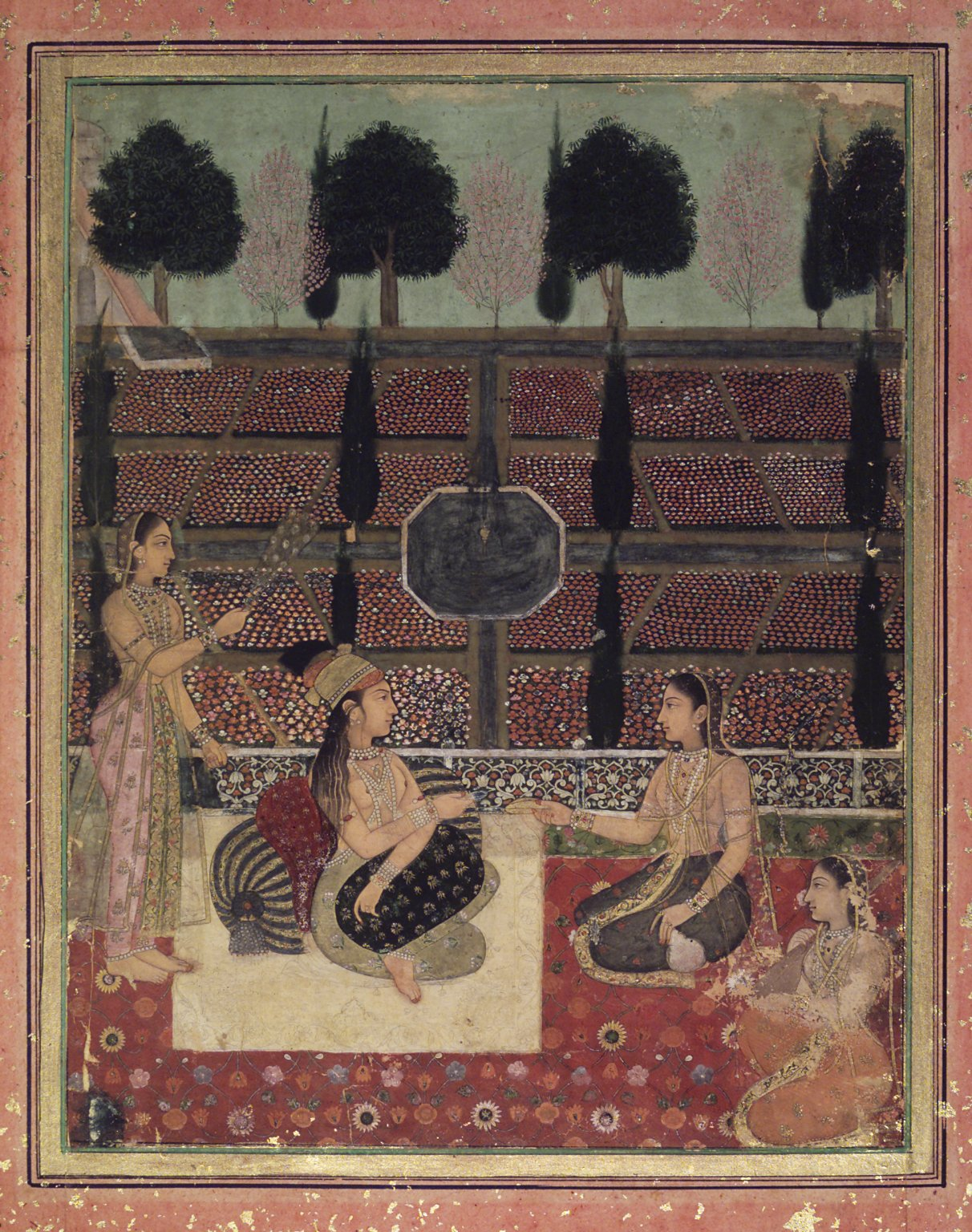
Ladies of the harem with attendants, 1700–1710

The harem was not just a place where women lived. Babies were born and children grew up there. Within the precincts of the harem were markets, bazaars, laundries, kitchens, playgrounds, schools and baths.

The harem had a hierarchy, its chief authorities being the wives and female relatives of the emperor and below them were the concubines. Mothers, step-mothers, aunts, grandmothers, step-sisters, sisters, daughters and other female relatives lived in the harem. There were also ladies-in-waiting, servants, maids, cooks, women, officials, and guards.

=== Padshah Begum ===
The highest position within the harem was that of the Padshah Begum, which, in most cases, was bestowed as a title to the empress or chief wife, though in some cases it could be an imperial princess or a sister of the emperor. It was considered the most important title in the Mughal Harem. Some concubines would make their way to the top and eventually become empresses and possess immense power, like Lal Kunwar, the favorite of Emperor Jahandar Shah who was bestowed the prestigious title of Imtiaz Mahal (lit. Distinguished one of the Palace)

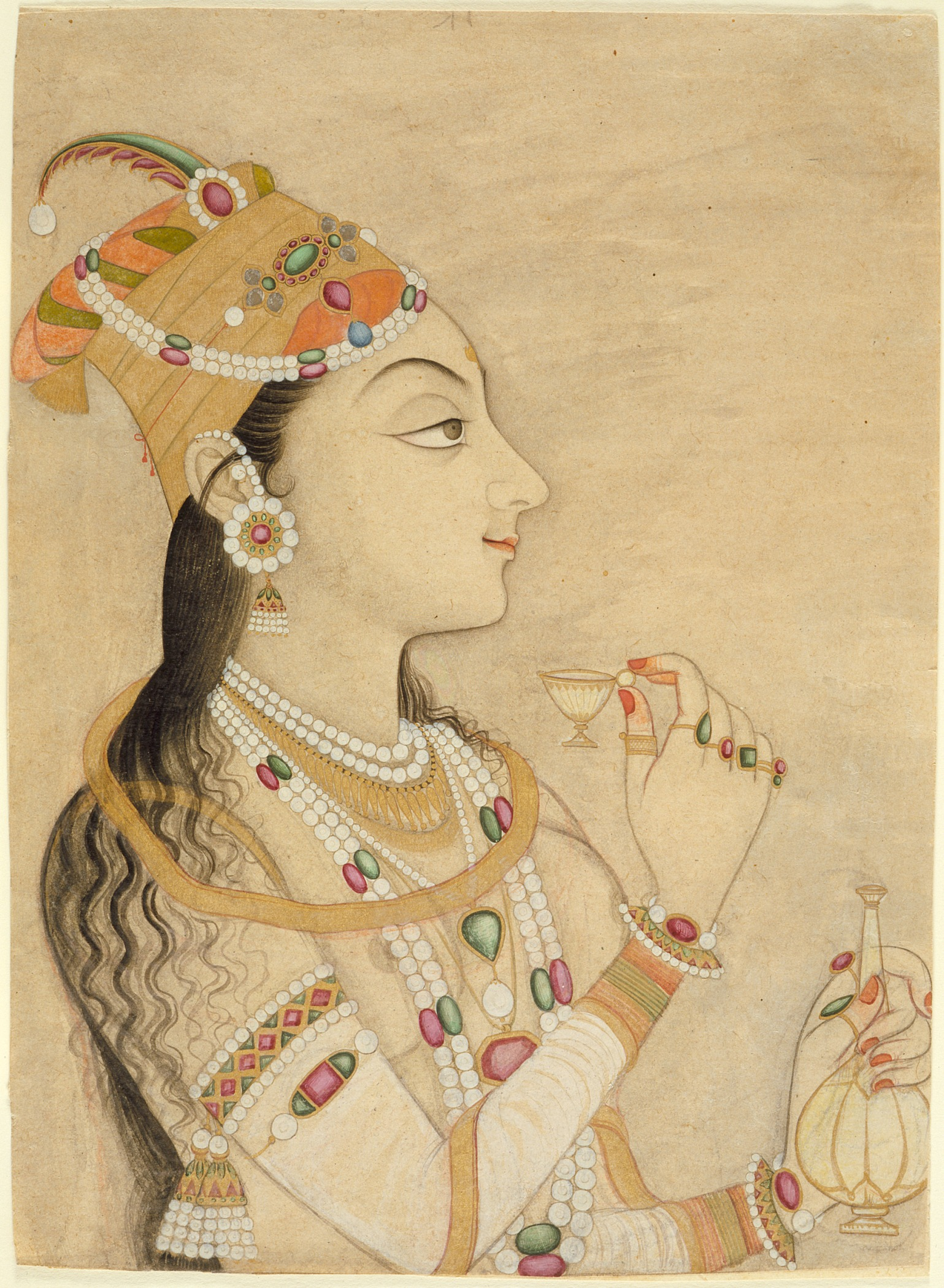
Empress Nur Jahan, Padshah Begum

The empress was second in power to the Queen Mother, and had the ability to issue farmans, (imperial decrees) and hukms. Empresses could play important roles in the politics of the empire, could influence diplomatic relations, and could oversee and maintain trade with foreign lands.

=== Consorts ===
Emperors and princes could have up to four chief consorts and an unlimited amount of consorts and concubines. These consorts were legal wives married to the emperor through nikaah marriages. Upon their arrival to the harem, all women and girls would be taught the palace etiquette and court manners by experienced governesses and instructors. The chief consorts occupied a position directly under the empress in the hierarchy. After the emperor's death they were treated with respect and honor conferred upon them as the dowager consorts of the previous emperor.

=== Concubines ===
Under the consorts were the concubines, who could be of an unlimited number. Women entered the harem as concubines through multiple ways, such as being captured as spoils of war, being captured from defeated kingdoms, imperial appointment, and as part of the dowers from political marriages. After entering the harem, they were given new names that matched their looks or personality.

They lived in shared living quarters in the harem called the Sunday Palace, Tuesday Palace, and Saturday Palace, each corresponding to which day the emperor could visit them. Important, favoured concubines were permitted to be the mistresses of their own palaces. A concubine could further her status and gain privileges by bearing the emperor's children, especially by bearing a prince. The children of concubines could be entrusted to be raised by the higher-ranked consorts, who had the ability to adopt them as their own. Upon the death of the ruling emperor they could choose to retire, thus the numbers were regularly renewed.

Within the harem were the accomplished kanchani or kanjari, who worked as palace dancers and singers and provided entertainment. They were highly skilled in singing, music, and dance, and performed on special occasions such as the birth of a imperial child, the royal weddings, and festivals. The Ain-i-Akbari states that "their extraordinary performances are beyond description" and that "each of them offers a special style of vocal accompaniment." They had a high chance of becoming concubines if they gained enough favor.

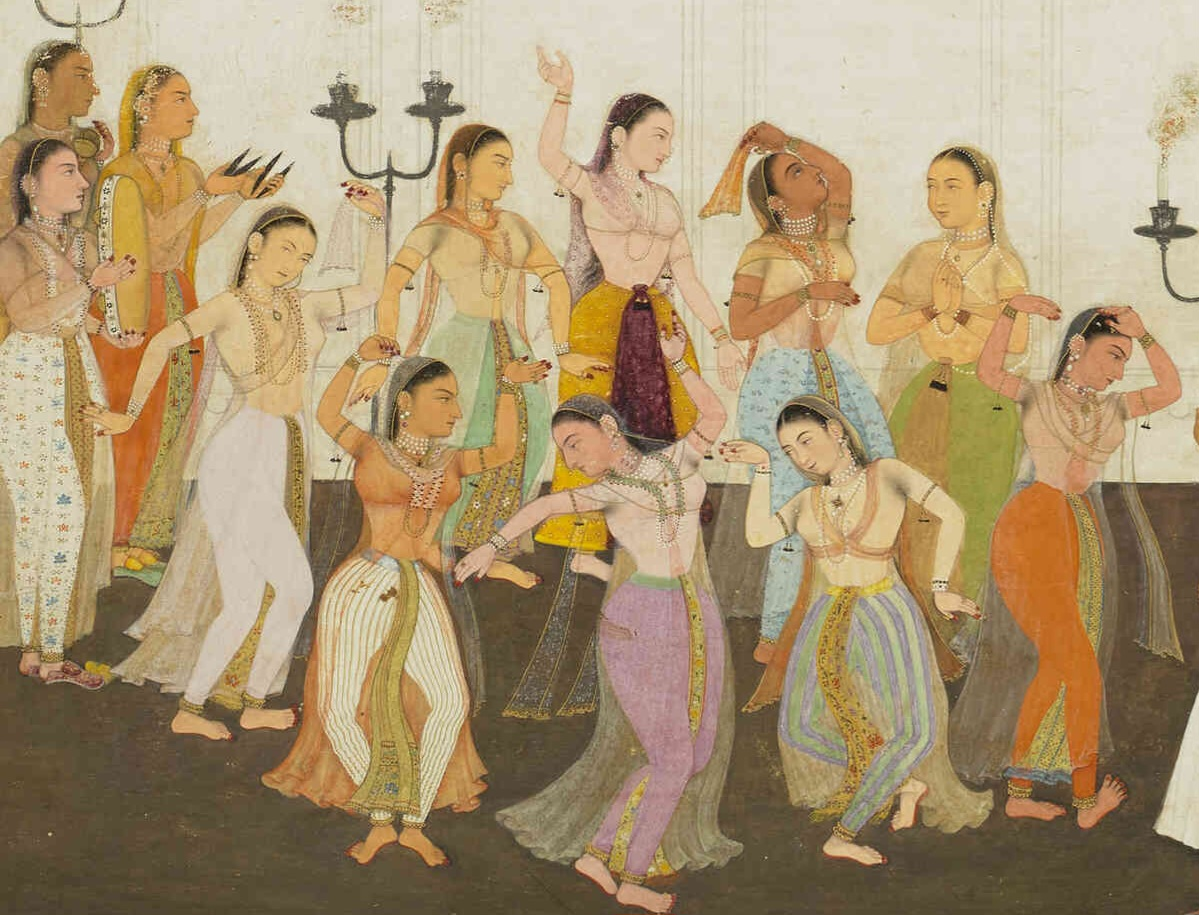
Dancers at the wedding of Prince Dara Shikoh, by court painter Bulaqi, from the Padshahnama

=== Role of the eunuchs ===
The harem was managed by the legion of eunuchs known as the Khwajasara, who were castrated men recruited to serve the members of the imperial family and the ladies of the harem. They acted as guards, attendants, informants, and were tasked with watching over the women of the harem. Eunuchs were employed in the harem because they couldn't pose a threat to the royal lineage and were thus free of any dynastic ambition. They were the trusted servants and confidantes of their mistresses and served them loyally.

The head eunuch of the harem was called the Nazir-e-Mahal (chief eunuch of the palace), and held considerable power and influence. The head eunuch was in charge of initiating new entrees to the harem and overseeing both trivial and important affairs within the harem. They were permitted to have their own servants and maids, and had access to material luxuries and wealth.

A legion of female superintendents called Daroghas (matrons) were assigned to handle the administration of the harem, maintaining order, and ensuring proper palace etiquette. The women who were chosen came from educated and respectable families, and were often appointed by the emperor himself. Being employed as a daroga in the palace was considered a great honor for the woman and her family.

For the protection of the ladies of the harem, female warriors called Urdubegis were put in charge.

The Mahaldars (chief female officers) were selected from among the darogas. They acted as spies, reporting conflicts, intrigue, and scheming within the harem to the emperor's ears, ensuring that the harem remained peaceful. Because the Mahaldars provided direct service to the emperor, they occupied a prestigious position and were highly ranked among the servants.

== Reform of Akbar ==
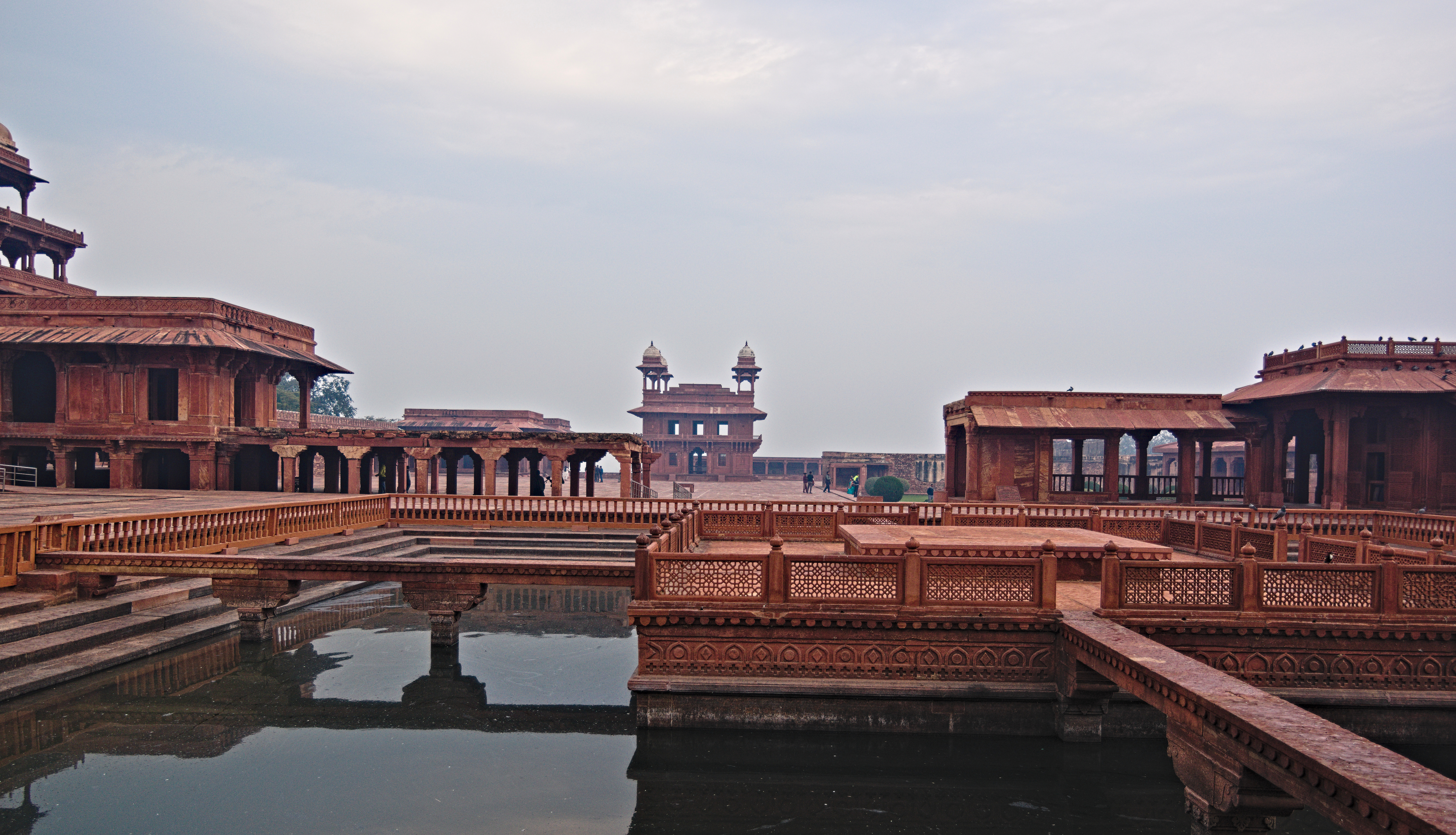
The harem complex at Fatehpur Sikri

Akbar's imperial harem was re-organized into a fortress-like institution which is quite in contrast to the image of the reigns of Babur and Humayun. Harbans Mukhia attributed this change to the growing influence of Rajput cultural ethos on Akbar ever since his marriage in 1562 to Mariam-uz-Zamani. With the construction of Fatehpur Sikri, Emperor Akbar saw the need to organize the administration of his zenana. This portion of the palace was reputably home to about five thousand women. While Abu'l-Fazl ibn Mubarak claims in the Akbarnama that each woman had her own suite of rooms, it is more likely that only members of the royal family and favorites of the emperor had their own apartments.

The zenana was divided into sections, with (female) daroghas tending to the organizational needs of the residents and working to keep the peace. Other administrative positions within the zenana included the tehwildars, or accounts officers responsible for the salaries and financial requests of the zenana inhabitants. The mahaldar, the female servant of the highest authority, often acted as an intelligence source from the zenana directly to the emperor. The anagas, or royal wet-nurses, were elevated to positions of rank though their purpose was not strictly administrative.

== The harem quarters and the inner palace ==
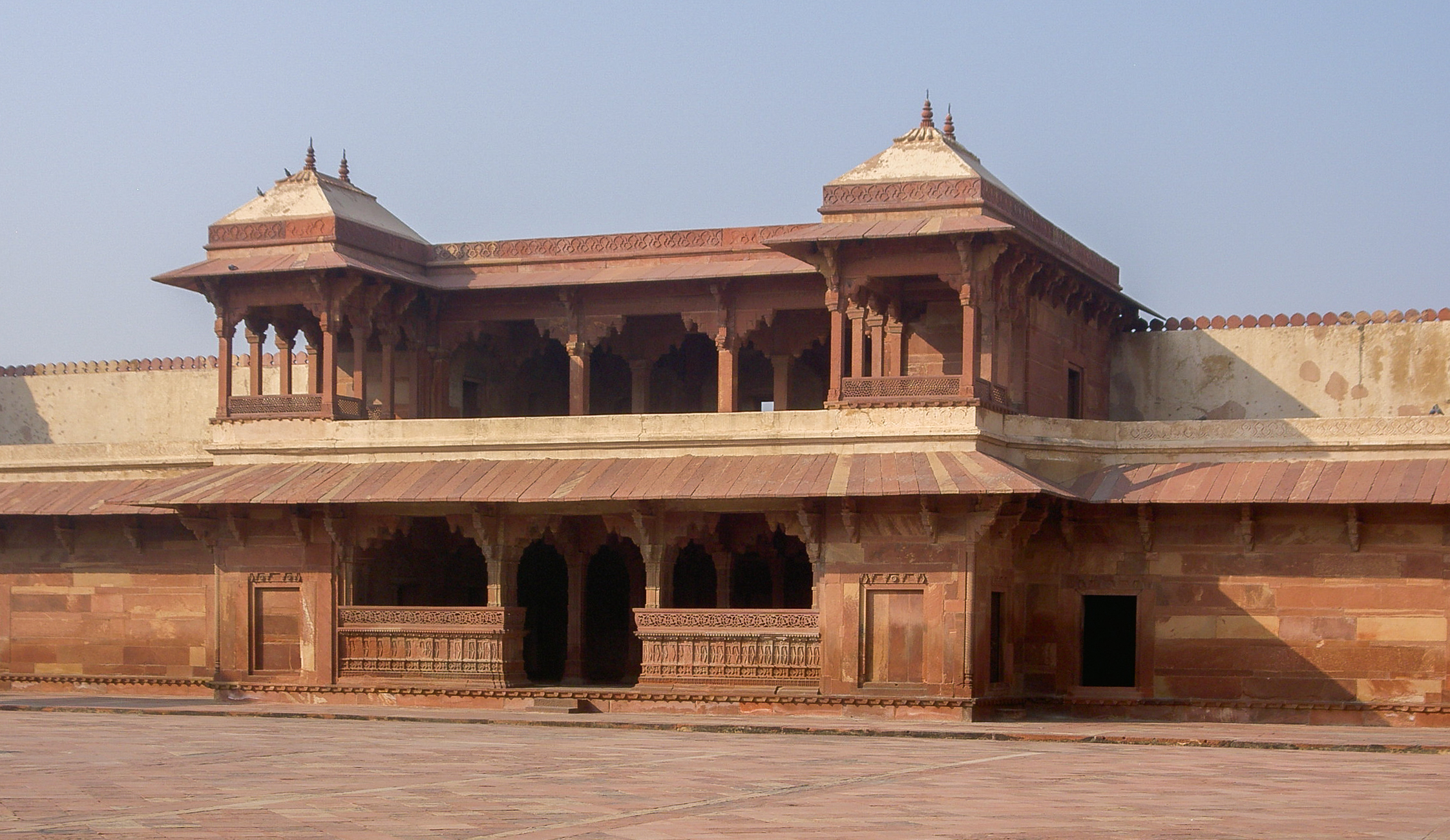
Mariam-uz-Zamani's palace in Fatehpur Sikri

The zenana was the size of a small city. Within it were the palaces and apartments of the women of the harem, usually allocated to the consorts, empress, empress dowager, princesses, or especially favoured concubines.

Empress Mariam-uz-Zamani had her own palace in the harem of Fatehpur Sikri called the Raniwas. it was the largest palace in the zenana complex. All the palaces and apartments were heavily guarded by the Urdubegis, skillful armed female warriors that were assigned to offer protection to the ladies of the harem. They were highly proficient in combat, such as lance and archery.

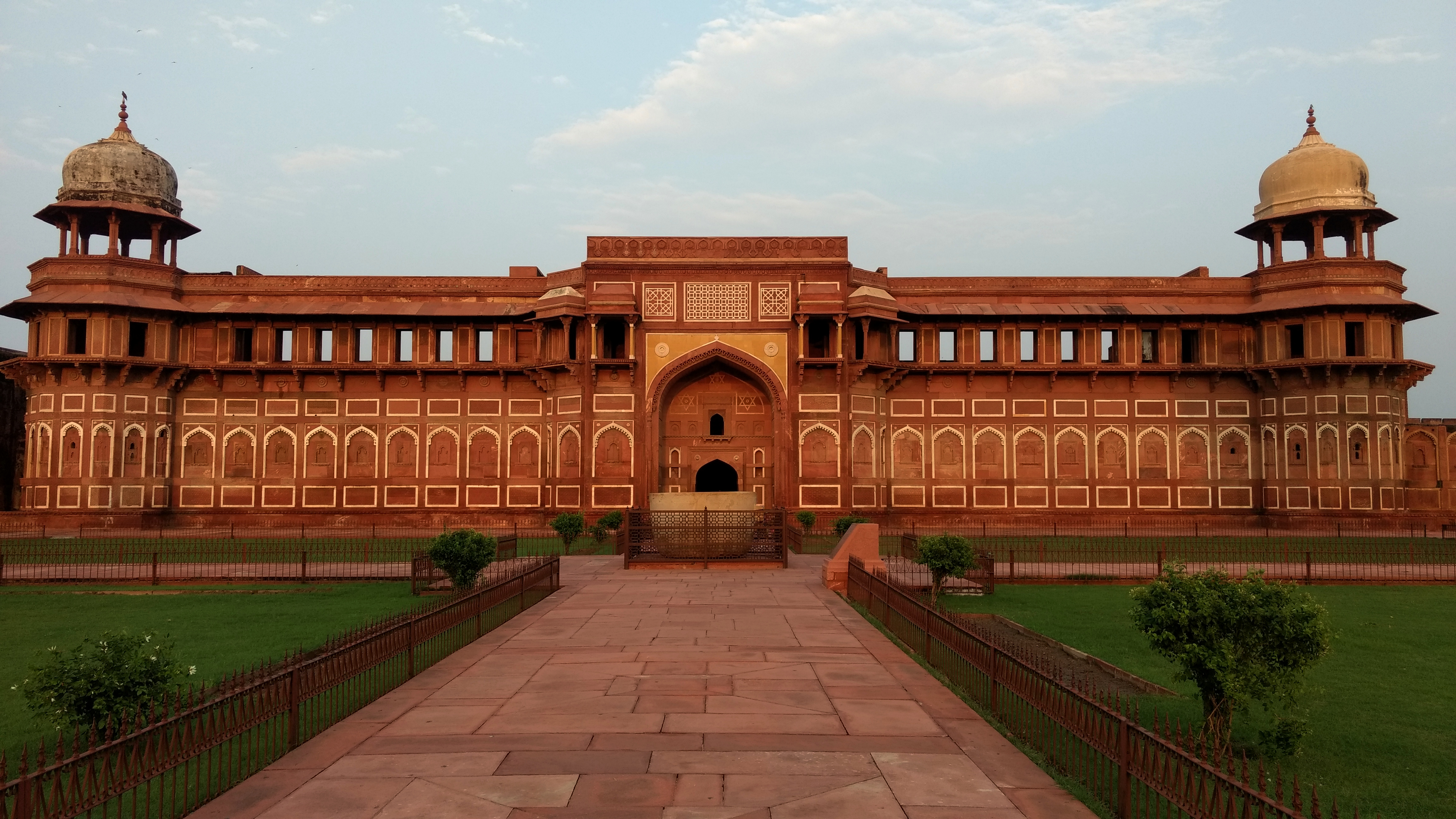
The Jahangiri Mahal

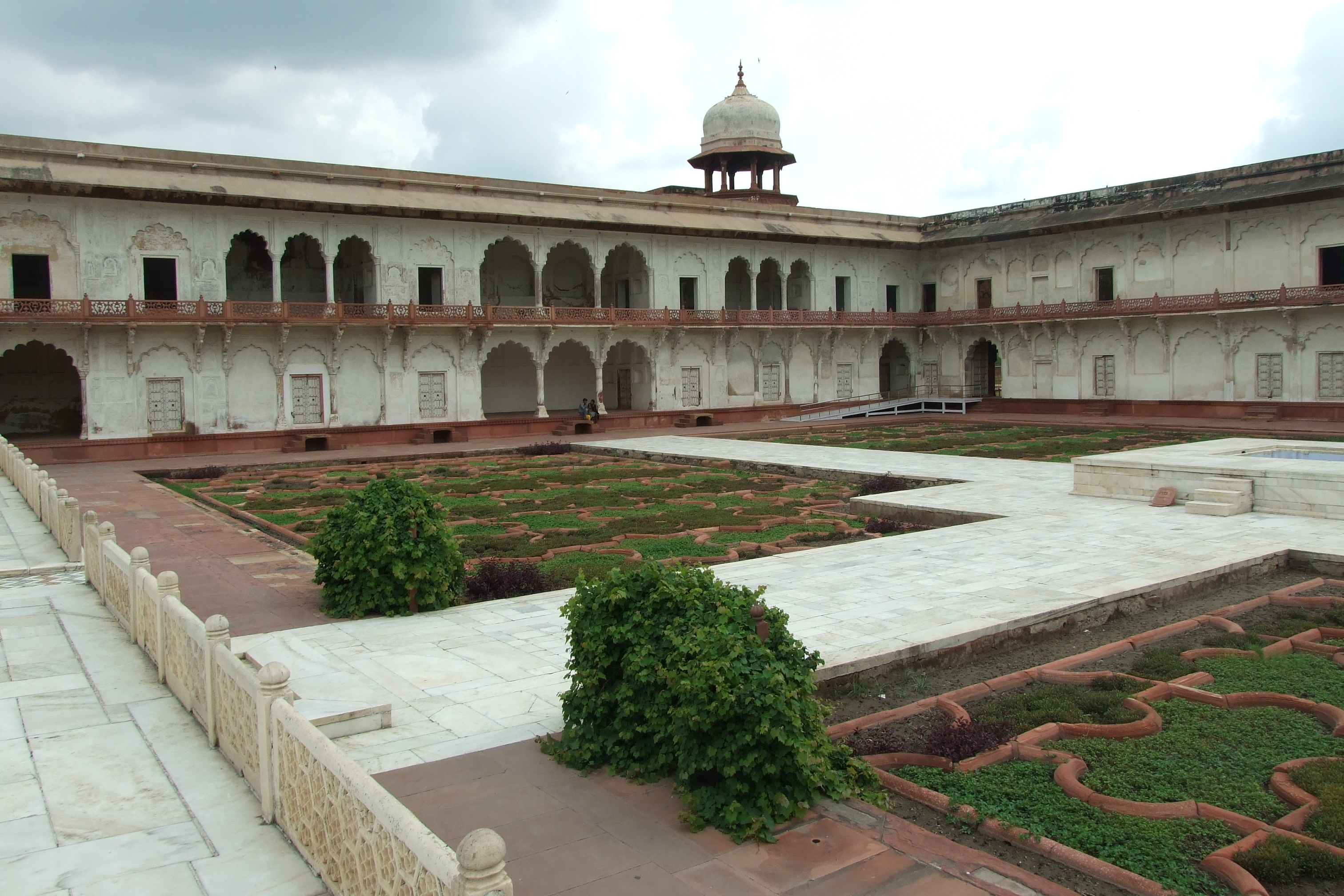
The pleasure garden Anguri Bagh

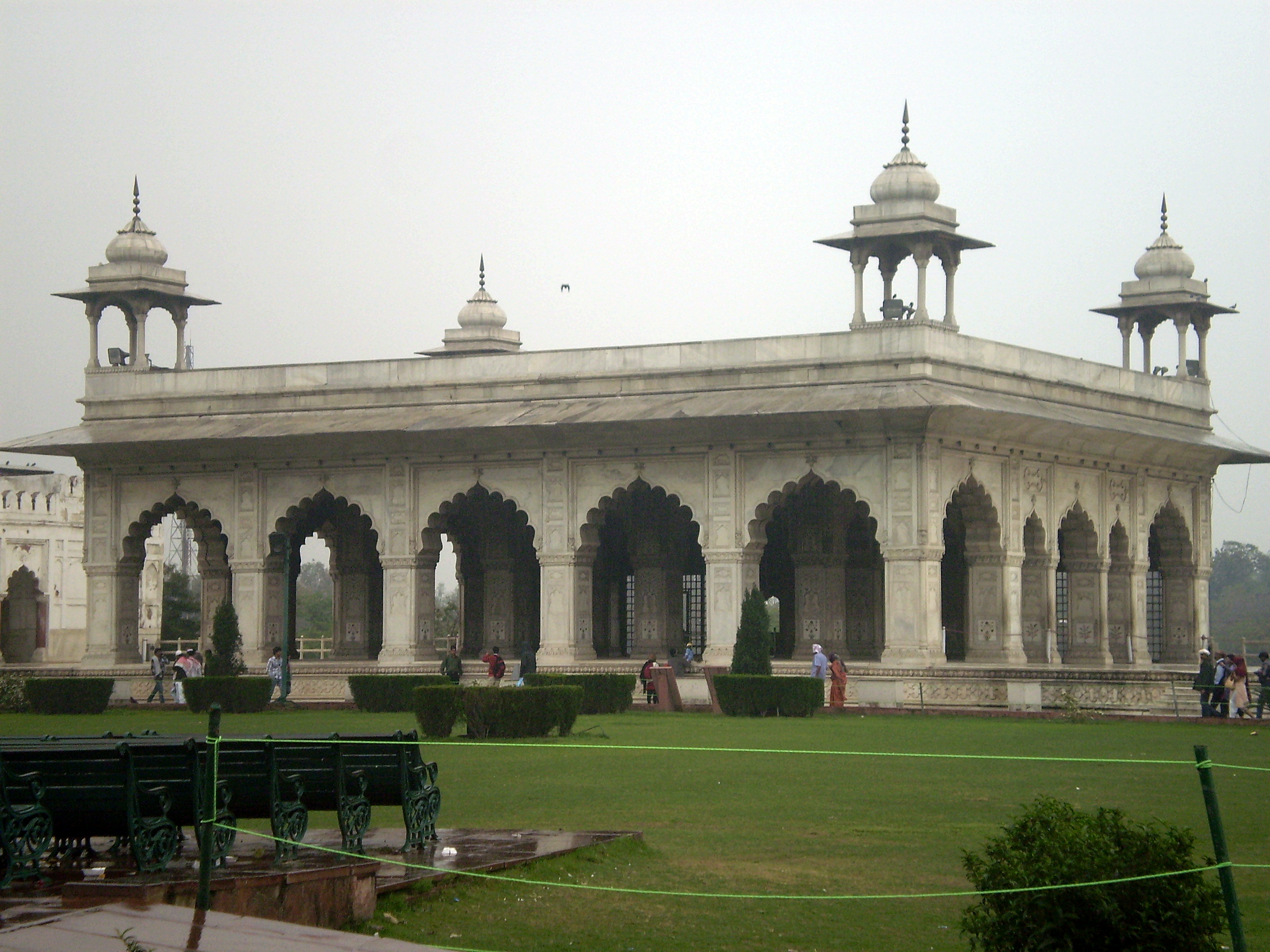
The Rang Mahal, built for the rest and relaxation of the women

== Business activity ==
Mughal women had control over the financial resources and were involved in various economic activities. They enjoyed annual incomes and used eunuchs as agents of commerce. Many women also commissioned buildings and gardens. Akbar's favourite wife, Mariam-uz-Zamani, is the earliest recorded woman of the Mughal empire who engaged in inland and overseas trade. During the reigns of Akbar and Jahangir, she built the largest ships that carried pilgrims to and from the Islamic holy city Mecca, ran an extensive trade of silk and several spices to international borders, and oversaw the trade with Gulf countries and nations. In the words of Findly, she had, in the larger arena, helped chart the role of Mughal women in the newly expanding business of foreign trade. Shah Jahan's daughter, Jahanara Begum contributed to many architectural projects of Shah Jahan's new capital, Shahjahanabad and she as well as her sister, Roshanara enjoyed an annual income often equal to that of high imperial mansabdars. They also had a strong administrative control over the domestic trade and gained large revenues from various towns. Jahanara received revenues from the port city of Surat, which was a profitable centre of overseas trade. Nur Jahan by system of tolls from internal trade had an income of 230,000 mahmudis. They combined their Economic sense with Political Activities to strengthen the monarchy and the empire.

=== Political activity and power ===
Many women of the Mughal Dynasty were ardent participants in political affairs, acting as mediators, peacemakers, and playing important roles in wars of succession. The imperial harem and imperial court had many times intersected in more ways than one. When Khusrau Mirza was imprisoned by Emperor Jahangir in 1605, Queen mother Mariam-uz-Zamani, Salima Sultan Begum, Jahangir's sisters, and Khusrau's stepmothers and sisters, had secured a pardon for the implicated prince. Nur Jahan is noted to have faked tears in front of the queen mother in hopes of the possession of Khusrau's charge, whom she considered a powerful contender to the throne, but was unsuccessful. Princesses Jahanara and Roshanara played an important role in the Mughal War of Succession in 1658 to 1659, choosing to support different princes- Dara Shikoh and Alamgir, as the future emperor.

== Humayun Nama ==
The Humayun Nama provides an insight into the lives of Mughal women. It was written by Gulbadan Begum, who was Humayun's sister. She describes in great detail the conflicts and tensions in the empire and how women played a mediating role in resolving them. For instance, Hamida Bano and Salima Sultan Begum brought about peace in the household when Salim revolted against his father in 1601. She also indicates that women knew about the political changes going on in their world and how they played a role in them. For example, she was approached by the traitor Mirza Kamran to write a letter to his brother asking him to join Kamran's campaign against the emperor.

== See also ==
- The Mughal Harem by K. S. Lal
