= Anthapuram =

Anthapuram (transl. palace) may refer to:

- Antahpura, women quarters in Indian palaces
- Anthahpuram, a 1998 Indian Telugu-language film
- Anthappuram, a 1980 Indian Malayalam-language film
