= Sati-un-Nissa =

Indo-Persian physician

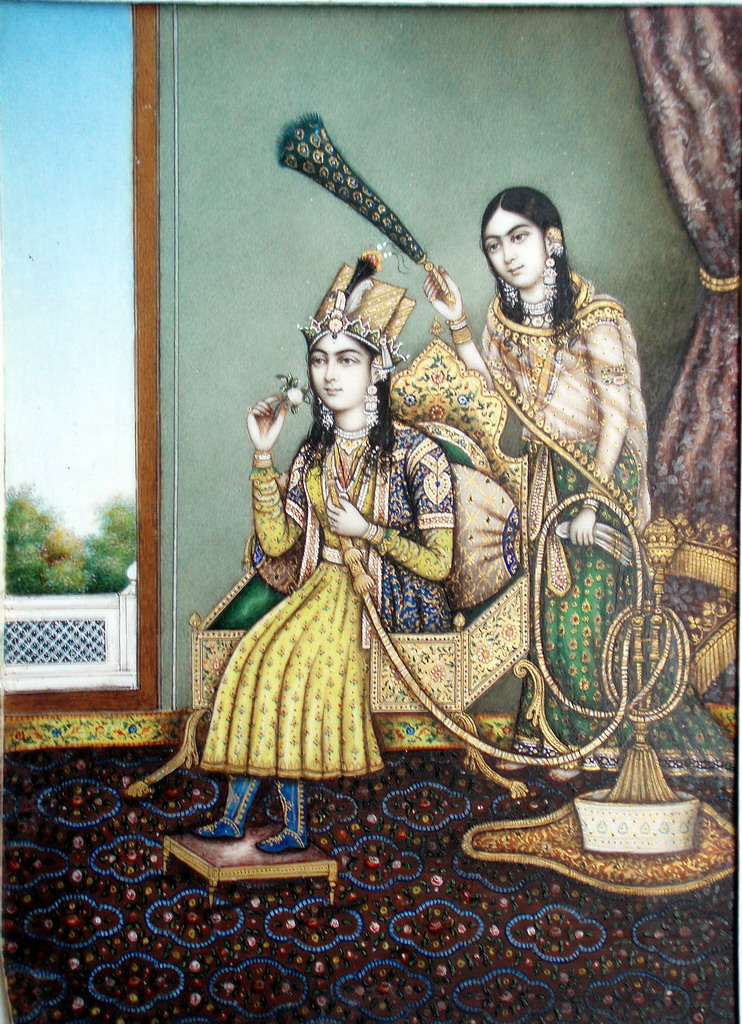
Mumtaz Mahal with an attendant, possibly Sati-un-Nissa.

Sati-un-Nissa, also known as Sati-un-nisa, Sati al-Nisa Khanam, Sati-al-Nesāʾ (born in Amol before 1580 — died in Lahore, 23 January 1647) was an Indo-Persian physician, a lady-in-waiting to Mumtaz Mahal, mahaldar of Shah Jahan, and tutor to their daughters Jahanara Begum and Gauhar Ara Begum.

== Life ==
Sati-un-Nissa was born in the Mazandaran province of Persia in a family of scholars and doctors. Taleb Amoli was her younger brother, while her maternal uncle was chief physician to the Safavid Shah Tahmasp I.

Little is known of her early life in Iran. She was likely born in or before 1580 as she is known to be older than Taleb whose birth is given around that year. Her brother had made his way to India, eventually becoming Emperor Jahangir's poet laureate (malek al-šoʿarā) in 1619. On his death in 1626 or 1627, Sati-un-Nissa adopted his two young daughters and brought them up as her own. There is a letter from Taleb to Jahangir asking permission to welcome his sister to India. Upon her husband Nasira's death in India, she joined the service of Mumtaz Mahal, the empress of Shah Jahan. With her knowledge of medicine and courtly etiquette, she was promoted to the head of the Empress' establishment, and named muhr-dar, the bearer of her seal. She was a tutor to Jahanara Begum, Mumtaz's daughter, whom she taught the Persian language. Under her tutelage, Jahanara became a respected poet. Sati-un-Nissa was an acclaimed reciter and teacher of Quran recitation.

Sati-un-Nissa was appointed as Sadr-i-Nath, an officer in charge of grants to the needy, by Shah Jahan. In particular, she was responsible for the disbursement of support to indigent women, especially unwed virgins who needed dowry for marriage, and to answer petitions by widows, scholars and theologians. As mahaldar (chief matron), she was expected to be the Emperor's eyes and ears in the imperial harem. She would read to him the reports received from the public (waqia-nawis) and private (khufyan-nawis) news writers, and respond to them on his dictation.

At Mumtaz Mahal's death during childbirth in 1631, Sati-un-Nissa escorted her body to Agra for burial. It is reported that Shah Jahan, bereft with grief, was unable to look on his newborn daughter, Gauhar Ara, who was then raised by Sati-un-Nissa.

Jahanara became the female head of the imperial family. As her chief assistant, Sati-un-Nissa was expected to convey presents to the brides of the royal princes. Returning with the gifts from the brides' families, she organised displays of the amassed gifts in public exhibitions at Agra Fort.

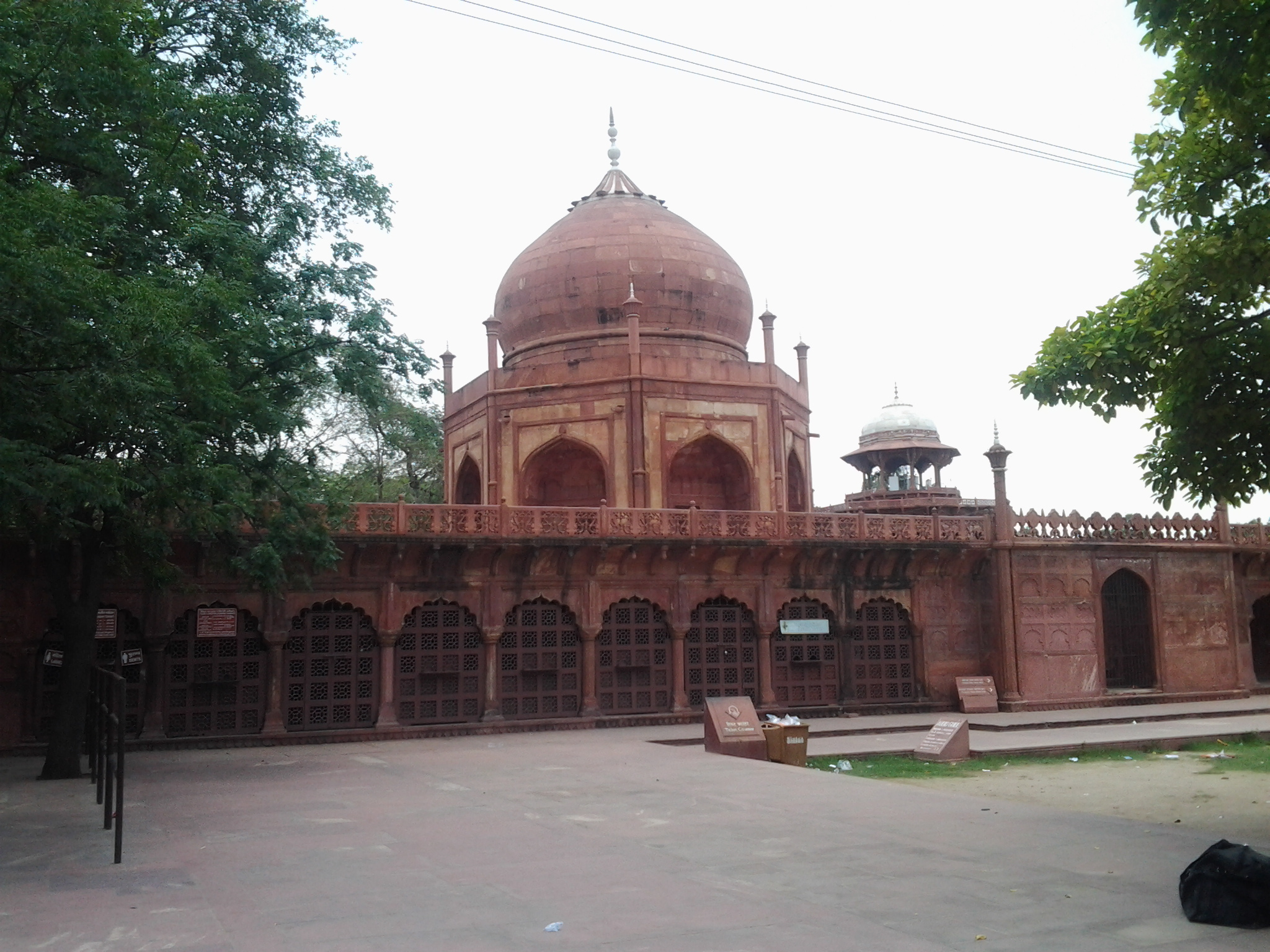
Sati-un-Nissa's tomb.

Her younger daughter died from complications following childbirth. A broken-hearted Sati-un-Nissa did not recover from this grief, and died a few days later in Lahore on 23 January 1647. Shah Jahan ordered Rupees 10,000 to be spent on her funeral. A year later, her body was moved to Agra to be interred in a tomb built especially for her, near the outer quadrangle of the Taj Mahal. The tomb stands to this day, east of the Fatehpuri Mosque and south-west of the Taj's forecourt.

== In popular culture ==
Nina Epton's novel Beloved Empress, Mumtaz Mahal is written from the point of view of Sati-un-Nissa. She also appears in Kathryn Lasky's Jahanara, Princess of Princesses.

== Bibliography ==
- Grewal, Royina (2007). In the Shadow of the Taj: A Portrait of Agra. Penguin Books India. ISBN 978-0-14-310265-6.
- Hansen, Waldemar (1986). The Peacock Throne: The Drama of Mogul India. Motilal Banarsidass. ISBN 978-81-208-0225-4.
- Hasan, Javed (1987). Settlement Patterns and Locality Names in Tajganj (PDF) (Thesis). Aligarh Muslim University.
- Iftikhar, Rukhsana (2016). Indian Feminism: Class, Gender & Identity in Medieval India. Notion. ISBN 9789386073730.
- Kinra, Rajeev (2015). Writing Self, Writing Empire: Chandar Bhan Brahman and the Cultural World of the Indo-Persian State Secretary. University of California Press. ISBN 978-0-520-28646-7.
- Lasky, Kathryn (2002). Jahanara, Princess of Princesses. Scholastic Inc. ISBN 978-0-439-22350-8.
- Lohman, Laura; Davary, Bahar; Ayubi, Zahra; Cannon, Byron (2013). "Qurʾān". The Oxford Encyclopedia of Islam and Women. Oxford University. ISBN 9780199764464.
- Losensky, Paul (2004). "Taleb Amoli". Encyclopaedia Iranica.
- Mukherjee, Soma (2001). Royal Mughal Ladies and Their Contributions. Gyan Books. ISBN 978-81-212-0760-7.
- Sarkar, Jadunath (1917). Anecdotes of Aurangzib, and Historical Essays (PDF). Calcutta: M. C. Sarkar & Sons.
- Tyabji, Laila (1997). "The Penguin Book of Classical Indian Love Stories and Lyrics, by Ruskin Bond; Beloved Empress, Mumtaz Mahal, by Nina Epton". The Book Review. 21.
