= Zenana =

Inner quarters where women lived in the Indian subcontinent

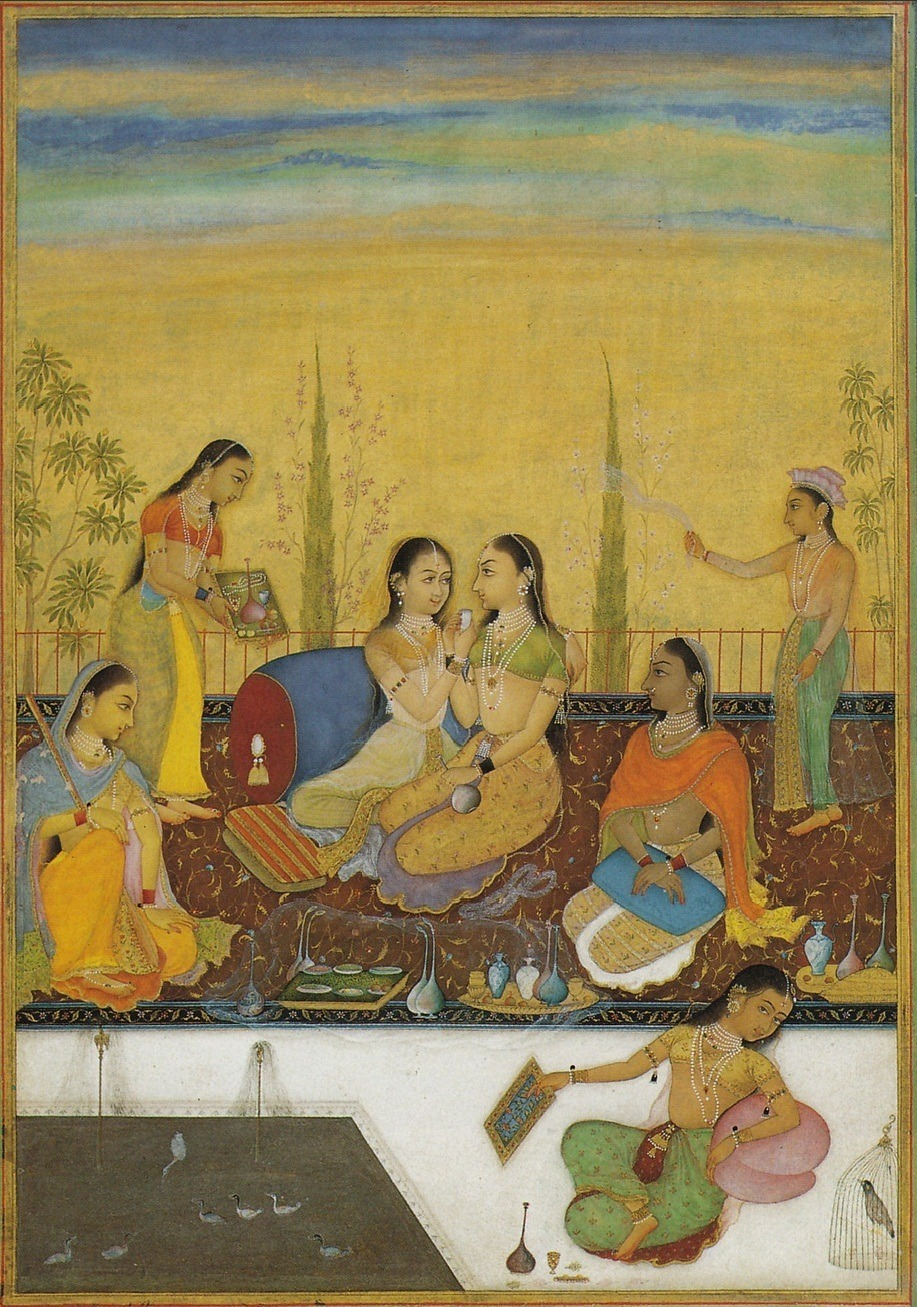
Ladies of the zenana on a roof terrace by Ruknuddin. Bikaner, 1675

A zenana (Persian: زنانه, "of the women" or "pertaining to women"; Urdu: زنانہ; Bengali: জেনানা; Hindi: ज़नाना) is the part of a house belonging to a Muslim family in the Indian subcontinent which is reserved for the women of the household. The zenana was a product of Indo-Islamic culture and was commonly found in aristocratic Muslim family homes. Due to prolonged interactions between Hindus and Muslims, upper-class Hindu households inclined to imitate élite cultural trends also embraced these designated spaces. The zenana were the inner rooms of a house where the women of the family lived and where men and strangers were not allowed to enter. The outer apartments for guests and men are called the mardana. Conceptually in those environments that practise purdah, it is the Indian subcontinent's equivalent of the harem.

Christian missionaries were able to gain access to Indian girls and women through the zenana missions; female missionaries who had been trained as doctors and nurses were able to provide female Indians with health-care and also evangelise them in their own homes.

== Mughal court life ==
A princess reclining on a terrace with her attendants.

Physically, the zenana of the Mughal court consisted of exceptionally luxurious conditions, particularly for princesses and women associated with high-ranking figures. Because of the extreme restrictions placed on access to the women's quarters, very few reliable descriptions are available. Still, modern scholars evaluating court records and travelogues contemporary with the Mughal period detail the women's lodgings as offering courtyards, ponds, fountains and gardens. The palaces themselves were decorated with mirrors, paintings and marble. Mariam-uz-Zamani had her own palace in Fatehpur Sikri's harem, which was the masterpiece fusion of Rajasthani and Persian elements and was the biggest residential palace of the fort. Jahanara, daughter of Shah Jahan and Mumtaz Mahal, famously lived in her own apartment decorated with valuable carpets, and murals of flying angels. Other amenities depicted in illustrations of court life include running water and meticulous gardens.

=== Resident population ===
Rather than being the prison-like space of licentious activity popularized for the European imagination by Orientalism, the zenana functioned as the domain of female members of the household, ranging from wives to concubines to widows, unmarried sisters and cousins, and even further distant relations who were considered dependent kin. In addition to the women of rank, the zenana was populated by attendants of various skills and purposes to provide for the needs of the ladies residing within. All visiting friends, servants, and entertainers were invariably female, down to the highly trained corps of armed women – guards known as urdubegis – assigned to escort and protect the women in the zenana.

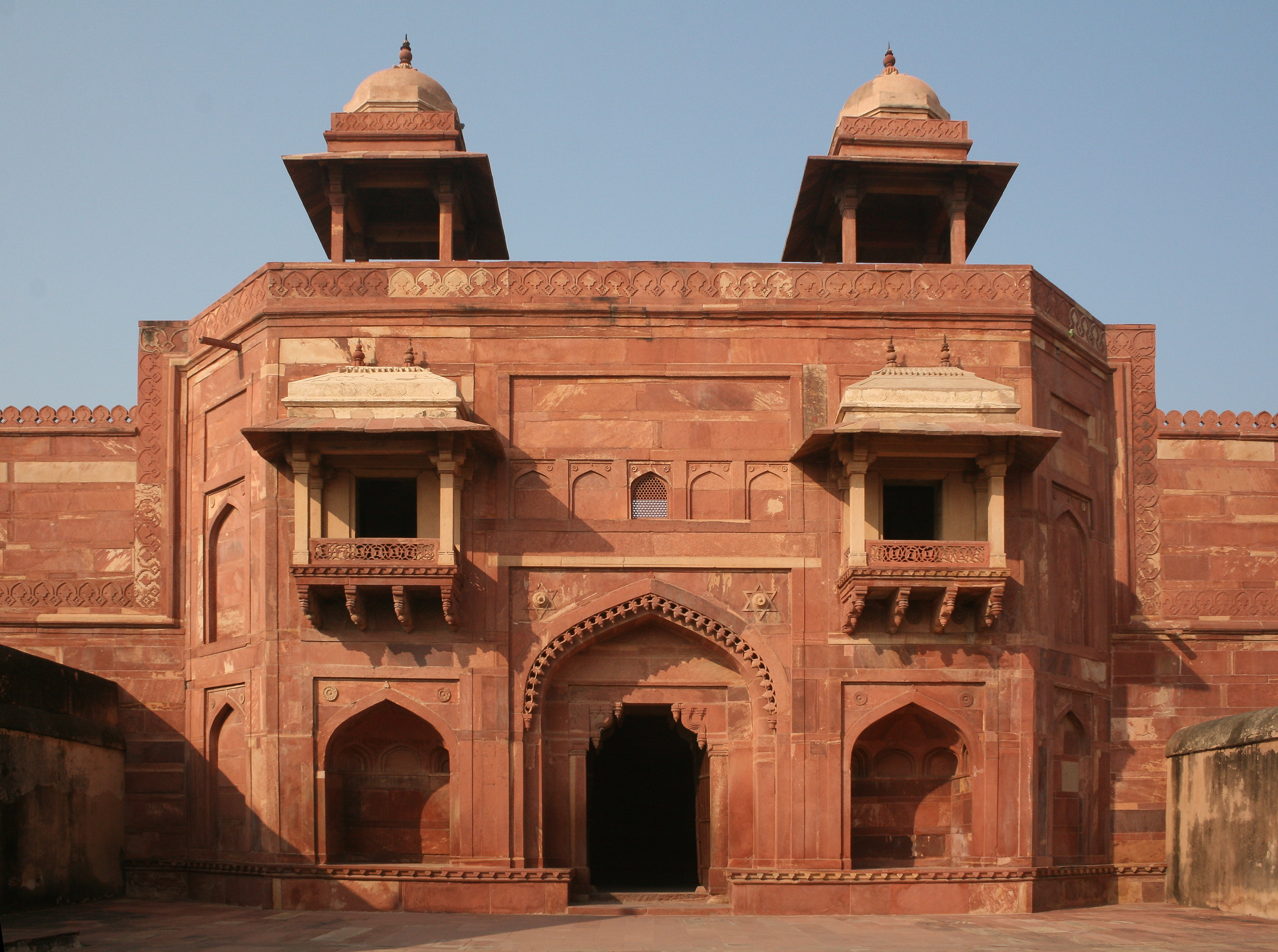
Entrance to the Jodha Bai Mahal in the harem at the Mughal city of Fatehpur Sikri

=== Administration ===
According to Abu'l-Fazl ibn Mubarak, author of the Akbarnama, the zenana of Akbar the Great at Fatehpur Sikri was home to more than five thousand women, who had each been given her own suite of rooms. The size of the zenana meant that it was a community unto itself, and it thus required systematic administration to maintain; all of these administrators were female. Abu'l Fazl describes the zenana as being divided into sections, with daroghas appointed to tend to the financial and organizational needs of the residents. Other administrative positions included the tehwildar, or accounts officer, responsible for the salaries and financial requests of the inhabitants. Then there were the mahaldars, the female servant of the highest authority chosen from within the ranks of the daroghas, who often acted as an intelligence source from the zenana directly to the emperor. The royal anagas (the Turki-language word used at the Mughal court for wetnurses) were elevated to positions of rank, though their purpose was not strictly administrative.

=== Political influence ===
It was because male members of Mughal society did not closely define the concept of purdah as a reflection of their own honor that wives, daughters, and particularly unmarried women in the upper-echelons of the empire were able to extend their influence beyond the physical structures of the zenana. That less-constrictive interpretation of purdah allowed the ladies of the Mughal court to indirectly participate in public life, most notably in civic building projects. Jahanara herself was responsible for the major alteration of Shahjahanabad, by constructing the now famous Chandni Chowk market in Old Delhi. Altogether, wives, daughters, and even a courtesan were the primary patrons of 19 major structures in the city. Owing to the cultural precedent set by their Timurid ancestors, it was comparatively more acceptable for Mughal women to perform civic charity in the form of building projects and even engage in leisure activities outside the zenana like hunting, polo and pilgrimage, than it would have been for their Safavid contemporaries. Nur Jahan seems to be unique in that she had a particular affinity for hunting, and was able to gain permission to accompany her husband Jahangir on several outings, even once killing four tigers easily with her excellent marksmanship.

=== Adherence to purdah ===
Despite the social freedom that came with being a member of the royal household, Mughal women did not go about unveiled and were not seen by outsiders or men other than their families. Instead, when they traveled they covered their heads and faces in white veils, and they were transported in howdahs, chaudoles, carriages and palanquins while covering on all sides, to maintain the modesty and seclusion required of purdah. When entering or exiting the zenana itself, female pallbearers carried their palanquins, and they were only transferred to male servants and eunuchs outside the walls of the zenana. Should outsiders be required to enter the zenana, as in the case of an illness where the lady could not be moved for her health, the visitor was covered from head to foot in a shroud and led blindly to the lady by a eunuch escort.

== Rajput zenana ==
Like their Mughal dynasty counterparts, the women of Rajput zenanas were classified by ranks such as pardayat, paswan, and khawas, ect. The chambers of the zenana within the Amber Fort, known as the Zanani Deorhi, all led to a central common courtyard where celebrations, ceremonies, and festivals would take place.

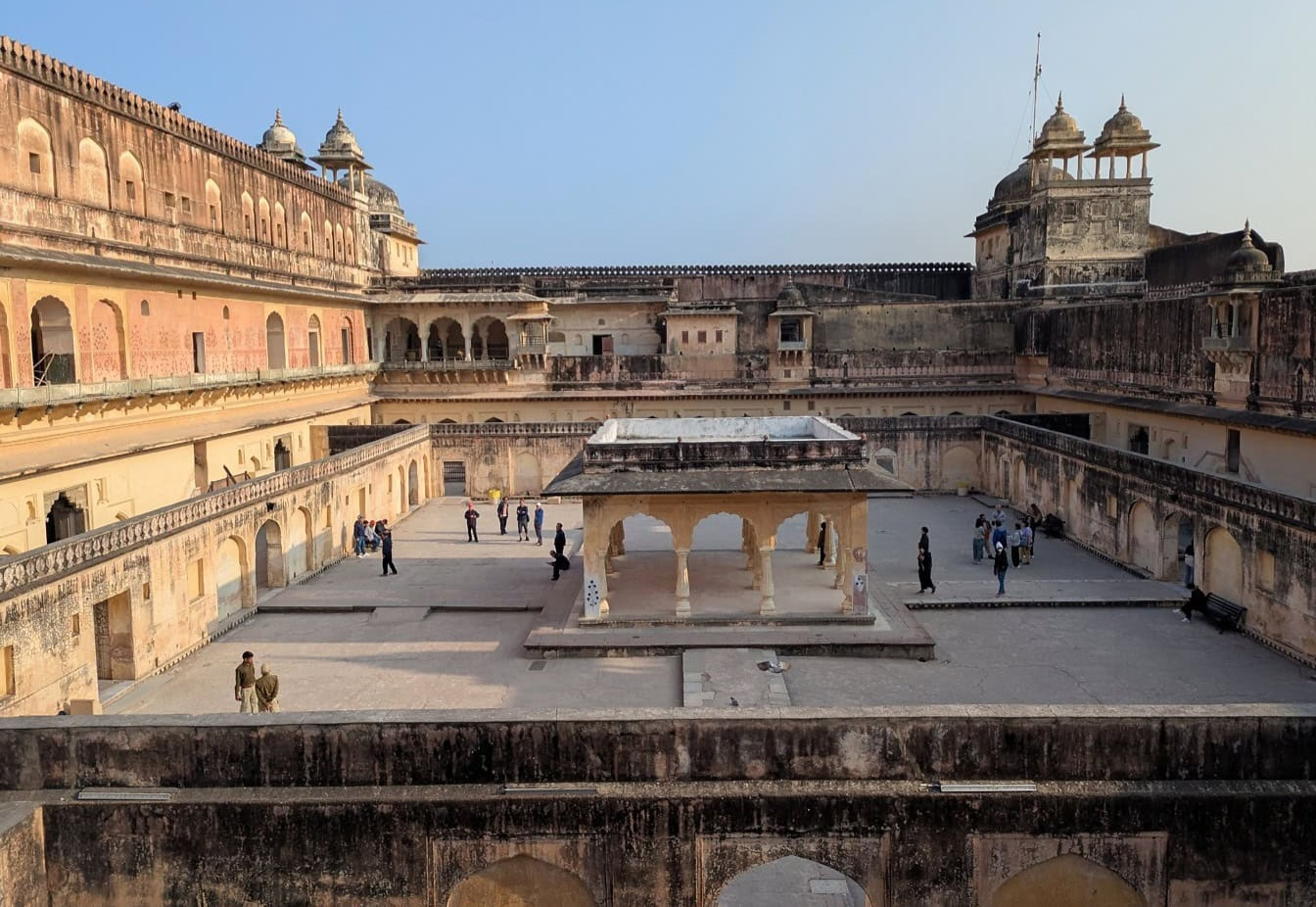
The Zenana Deorhi courtyard in the Amber Fort.

Queens and queen mothers had great influence and power and would commission temples and stepwells to be built. Gulabrai, one of Raja Vijay Singh's concubines, had risen up the ranks as his favorite, eventually wielding great political power and influence.

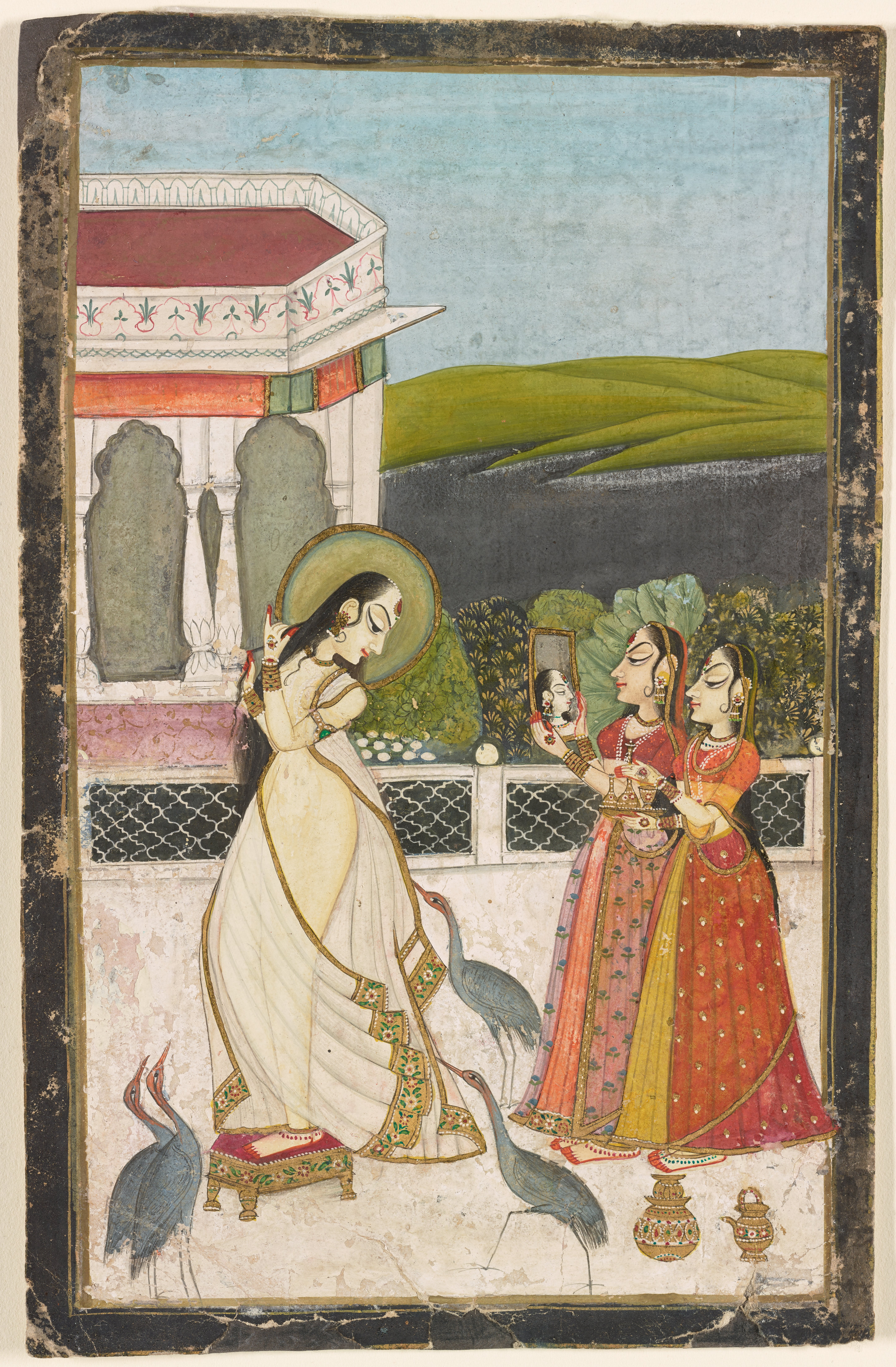
A lady of the zenana getting ready. Kishangarh, c.18th century.

== Zenanas of South Indian dynasties ==
The zenanas of the southern dynasties and kingdoms were frequently referred to as the "Antahpuram" or "Antahpura". The Zenana Mahal complex at Hampi was elaborate, with pavilions and fountains, and contained beautiful and intricate architecture which mixed the typical Vijayanagara style with indo-islamic elements. Rani Tirumaladevi, as the chief empress, had a large number of servants and had a treasury of her own, and accompanied Krishnadevaraya on military campaigns.

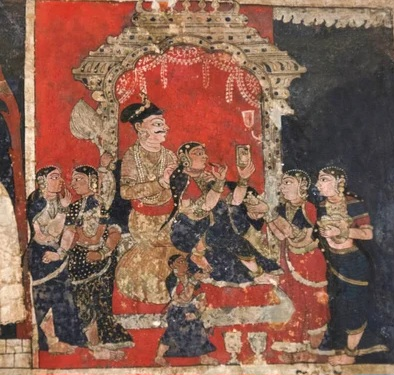
Servants attending to a noble woman. Shravanabelagola mural, Karnataka.

The zenanas of the Deccan Sultanates were peripatetic and many women from the zenana would accompany armies when they battled against the neighbouring deccan kingdoms and the Vijayanagara empire. There were many powerful women who ruled from the zenana, such as Chand Bibi and Hayat Bakshi Begum. When Chand Bibi would go riding, she was accompanied by her entourage consisting of women of different ranks from the zenana, including the armoured Urdubegis.

== See also ==
- Mughal Harem
- Andaruni
- Harem
