= Urdubegis =

Class during the Mughal Dynasty

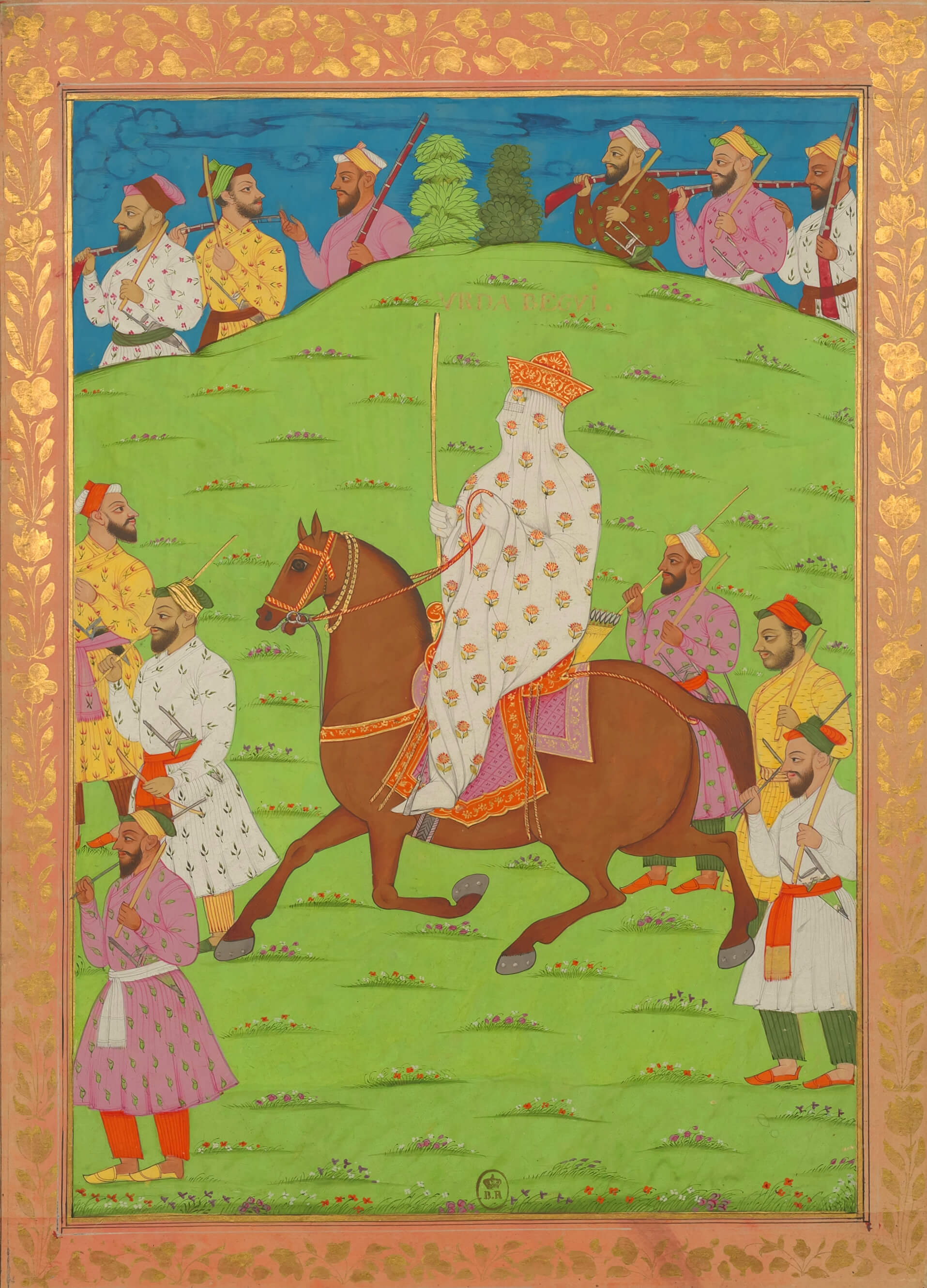
Mughal miniature of Urdu Begi raiding horse in Niccolao Manucci's Storia do Mogor c. 1698

During the Mughal Dynasty, urdubegis were the class of women assigned to protect the emperor and inhabitants of the zenana of the Mughal Harem.

Because the women of the Mughal court lived sequestered under purdah, the administration of their living quarters was run entirely by women. The division of the administrative tasks was dictated largely by the vision of Akbar, who organized his zenana of over 5,000 noble women and servants. The women tasked with the protection of the zenana were commonly of Habshi, Tatar, Turk and Kashmiri origin. Kashmiri women were selected because they did not observe purdah. Many of the women were purchased as slaves, and trained for their positions.

They are mentioned as early as the reigns of Babur and Humayun, and were proficient in weapons combat, specifically lance, and archery. Mughal emperors spent a great deal of their leisure time in the zenana, and slept there at night, therefore the women assigned to protect the women's quarters were also part of the larger system in place to protect the emperor. The urdubegis of the Mughal court were very skillful warriors. In 1719 Farrukhsiyar hid in his harem, fearing for his life, and the armed guard of the mahal readied themselves for battle.

== History ==
As per the historical records, the first Mughal Emperor, Babur brought his harem with him to India in 1526, when he defeated Ibrahim Lodi and established the famous Mughal rule in India. The harem, or the zenana, was the sphere of women, one of the three important domains that defined the Emperor's powers, the other two being his army, and the treasury. The Emperor was the only male member who had access to the harem, and spent a significant portion of his time there.

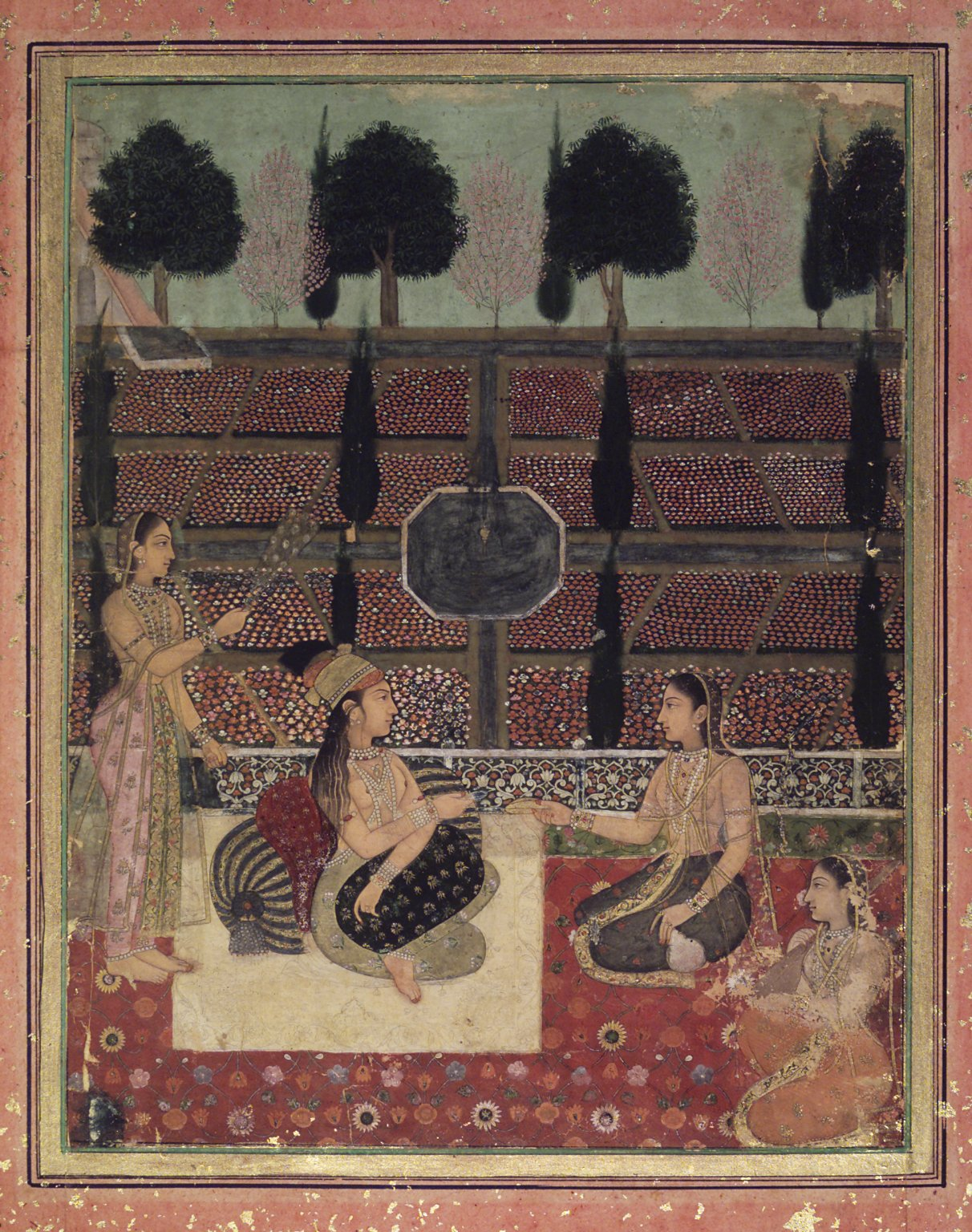
Scenes from a Mughal Harem.

Therefore, there were several female officials in the harem to ensure its proper administration, which included Angas or foster-nurses, Daroghas, Mahaldars or chief-intendents, the eunuchs, and Urdubegis or warrior women guards who were responsible for maintaining the security of the harem premises. These women were picked out from among the pool of the harem ladies and the eunuchs, trained to use weapons and serve as warrior-guards in the absence of male soldiers in the harem premises. It refers to a peculiar system which emerged during the Mughal Rule that managed to solve the problem of security in women's quarters, and till date remains a significant example of the genius of Mughal administrative prowess.

During Babur, and Humayun's reign, when the Mughal throne was not sufficiently consolidated, the harem was mobile, following wherever the Emperor went next. Accordingly, it was necessary to have the range of trustworthy female guards and thus, the army of Urdubegis were constituted. They also followed the harem during excursions and sieges, and kept guard in the palace mansions where the Emperor's male soldiers were prohibited from entering. Many of these warriors ascended the ranks, with time, or were granted a promotion by the Emperor in return for a favour. For instance, Bibi Fatima, the only known Urdubegi, was first a wet-nurse in Humayun's period, but was promoted to the rank of an Urdubegi by his son Akbar.

Their occupation required them often to sacrifice their pardahs, and sometimes women were selected from only those tribes which did not practice pardah, such as the Habshi, and Turks. Some of them also belonged from the Tartar and Kashmiri tribes. Accounts describing Humayun and Akbar's rules also mention these Urdubegis.

The women were taught to use both long-range and short-range weapons, wild bows, arrows and spears, and take the vow of loyalty for often they were responsible for guarding the Emperor and the Queen. Aurangzeb, writes K.S Lal in his book entitled The Mughal Harem, refused to visit his father Shah Jahan, during the conflict of his succession to the throne, fearing that the female armed guards would attack him,. Shah notes the Urdubegis were ferocious and skillful warriors, and known for their resolute strength.

== Bibi Fatima ==
From the large number of women, who have served as the Urdubegis under Mughal rule, we only know the name of one, that is Bibi Fatima. Her name is mentioned by Gulbadan-Begum, Humayun's half-sister who wrote his biography the Humayun-nama. It is interesting, how in all other biographies, written by male authors, we do not find exclusive mention of an Urdubegi.

Fatima originally worked under Humayun, as the Anga or wet nurse, and took care of the Emperor when he fell sick, and remained in his service until his death. After his death in 1556, she continued her service under Akbar. Impressed by her dedicated service to Humayun, Akbar promoted her as the chief of the Urdubegis. She earned her place, proving to Akbar that even in that position she would be her Emperor's trusted servant-warrior. Later, Fatima's daughter Zuhra, was married off to Humayun's wife Hamida's brother, who later murdered her. The Humayun Nama mentions:

“In 1564, Bibi Fatima lamented to Akbar that Khwaja Mu’azzam had threatened to kill his wife Zuhra, who was her daughter. The emperor consequently sent the Khwaja word that he was coming to his house and followed the message closely. As he entered, the Khwaja stabbed Zuhra and then flung his knife, like a challenge, amongst the loyal followers.”

== Decline ==
With the coming of the colonial rule, and the defeat of the Mughals after Bahadur Shah Zafar that ensured their erasure from the socio-political landscape, the harem disappeared, and disintegrated. As the primary source and the necessity of the Urdubegis weren't there anymore, their position and social status declined. Many became courtesans, or dwindled to the position of beggars under colonial exploitation. In the wake of the colonial gaze interpreting history, the harem became a definite orientalist, and exotic space, from wherein the mention of the Urdubegis were removed. The harem came to largely symbolise the Mughal monarch's sexual playground, and its complexities were reduced under such a biased historical analysis.
