= Jama Mosque, Agra =

Mosque in Agra, Uttar Pradesh, India

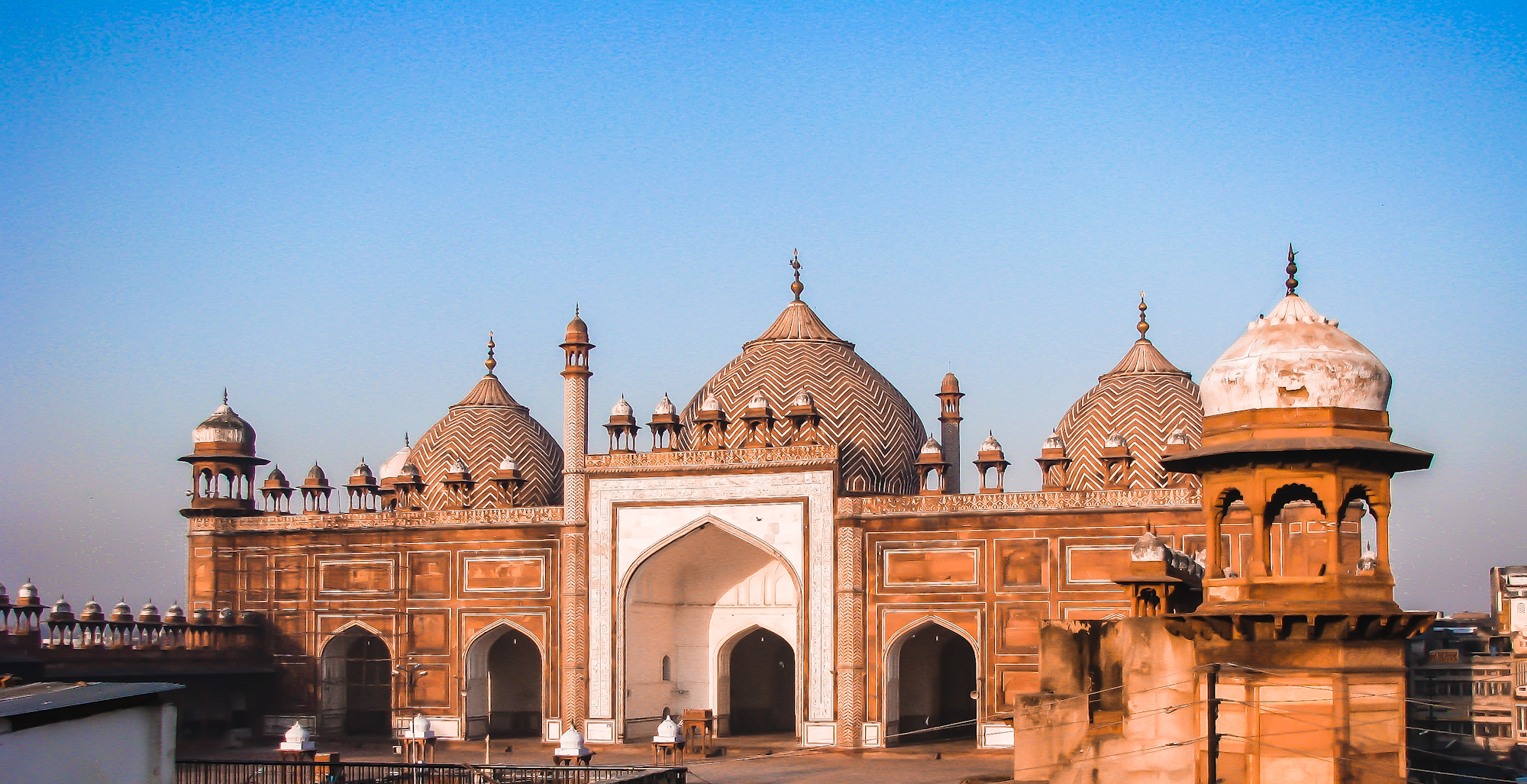

- India Jama Mosque, Agra (India)

Religion
- Affiliation: Islam

Location
- Location: Agra, Uttar Pradesh, India
- Coordinates: 27°10′55.4″N 78°00′58.3″E

Architecture
- Type: Congregational mosque
- Founder: Jahanara Begum
- Groundbreaking: 1643
- Completed: 1648
- Construction cost: 5 lakh rupees

Specifications
- Dome: 3
- Site area: 1200 square metres
- Materials: Red sandstone, marble

The Jama Mosque is a 17th-century congregational mosque located in the historic core of Agra, Uttar Pradesh. It was built by Jahanara Begum, the eldest daughter of Mughal Emperor Shah Jahan, during the latter's reign. It is the principal mosque in the city of Agra, and lies close to Agra Fort.

== History ==
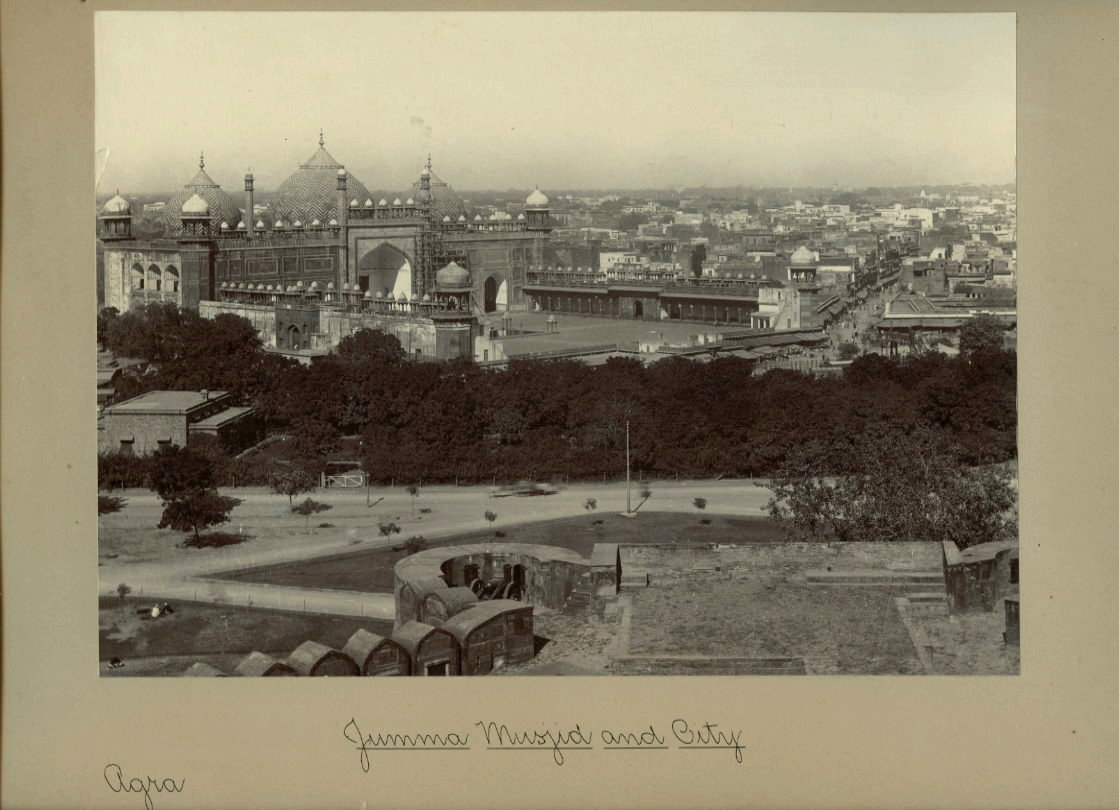
Jama Masjid and Agra city, 1890s.

According to accounts in the official court chronicle, Shahjahannama, the Jama Masjid originated from an imperial decree by Mughal emperor Shah Jahan in the year 1637. Shah Jahan ordered that a new mosque be built in Agra, situated alongside a new chowk (plaza) in front of the Agra Fort's Delhi gate. Shah Jahan's eldest daughter, the princess Jahanara Begum, requested permission from the emperor to personally endow the new mosque, which was granted. This was one of several reconstruction projects of the period in Mughal Agra, and represented a renewed attempt at building a congregational mosque for the city; the construction of one had commenced earlier by the Yamuna river, but this was interrupted and abandoned when attention was diverted towards completing the Taj Mahal. Ebba Koch suggests two possible reasons for the shift in location to the area around the fort; either the riverfront area was deemed more residential than religious, or the new mosque was feared to overshadow the Taj Mahal's mosque building. Wayne Begley provides the reason of the older site being too distant from the city.

The construction site was on land mostly owned by the crown, though some of it had to be bought from its private owners. A number of houses were demolished to widen the streets leading to the mosque. Construction of the mosque began in 1643; scholar Catherine Asher attributes the delay to the purchase of land. The mosque was completed in 1648, coming at a cost of five lakh rupees. The newly-constructed chowk spanned the area between the mosque and the Agra Fort, and was known as Tripolia.

The mosque's main gate, and an enclosure adjoined to the mosque's eastern side, were destroyed around the Indian Mutiny of 1857 by a British garrison occupying the Agra fort. The purpose was to provide a clearer line of fire for gunners of the fort. The mosque was also mined with gunpowder, rigged to explode, on account of being a security threat due to its proximity to the fort. By 1875, the Tripolia chowk was no longer extant; it was destroyed to make way for a railway station near the fort.

== Architecture ==
The Jama Masjid of Agra is an early example of imperial city-mosques endowed during the reign of Shah Jahan. It is primarily built of red sandstone, with white marble used intermittently. The mosque covers an area of 1200 square metres, and is elevated above ground level by a raised podium. Decoration on the mosque structure consists of reliefs and mouldings, executed in sandstone with marble inlays. The mosque's plan and elevation are similar to that of the Wazir Khan Mosque, another Mughal mosque of Shah Jahan, built a decade prior in Lahore.

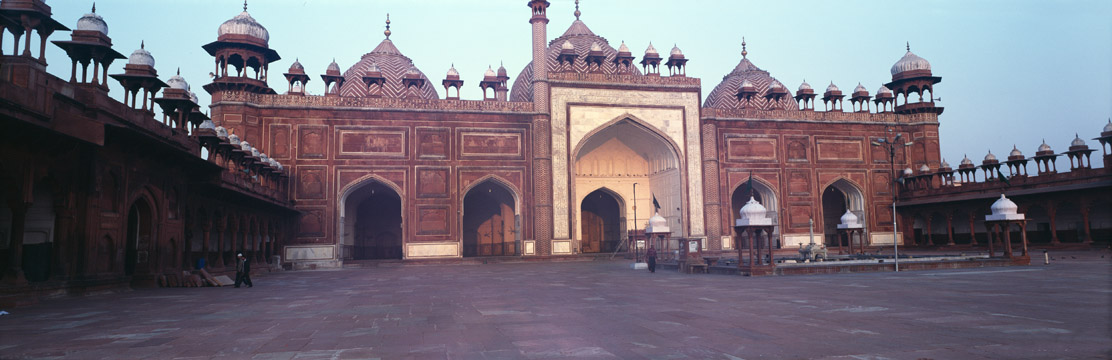
Jama Masjid

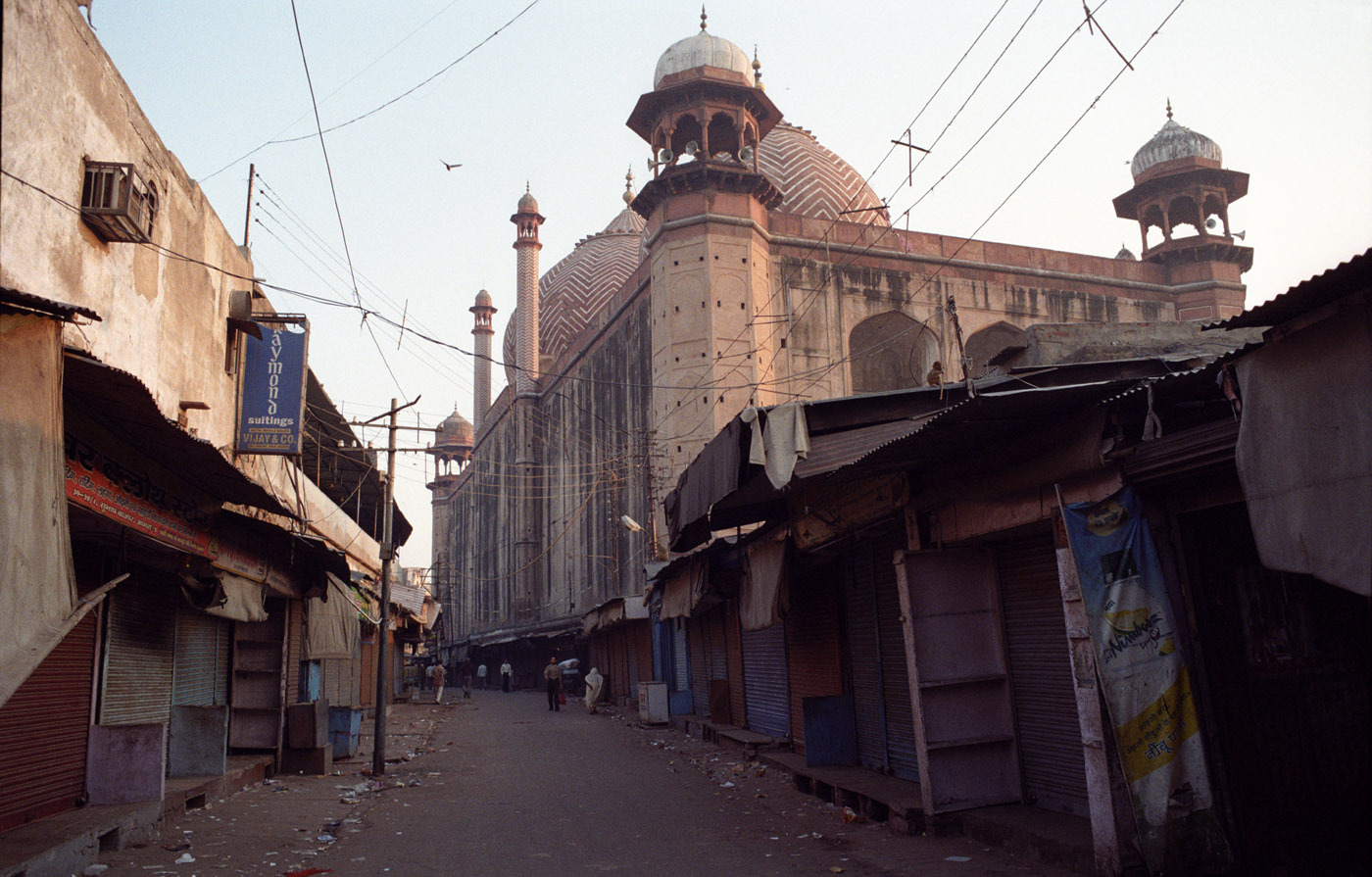
A back-side view of the Jama Masjid

The prayer chamber of the Jama Masjid bears five entrance archways, with the central one being set within a high pishtaq. The pishtaq features Persian inscriptions (largely praising the rule of Shah Jahan), executed as black letters inlaid in white marble, similar to the Taj Mahal. The prayer chamber is topped by three bulbous domes, which are decorated in a herringbone (zigzag) pattern of red and white stone. The domes are topped with lotus-flower finials. The prayer chamber contains a minbar (pulpit), typical of congregational mosques, but the minbar is unique in that it bears an engraving of the mosque's east facade.

The sahn (courtyard) of the mosque is enclosed on two sides. These sides are continuous arcades, bearing axial gates. In the centre of the courtyard is a pool, meant for ritual ablutions.

== In Literature ==
An engraving of this mosque from a painting by William Purser appears in Fisher's Drawing Room Scrap Book, 1832 together with a poetical illustration by Letitia Elizabeth Landon.
