= Mahaldar =

Chief officer of the imperial harem in the Mughal Empire

Mahaldars of Bengal in the Mughal Empire were the chief officers of the imperial harem. Chosen from the ranks of the darogha administrators of the zenana, the mahaldar was responsible for maintaining order in this large community of women. Niccolao Manucci writes that "the way in which these kings are waited on deserves mention. For just as the king has his officers outside, he has the same among the fair sex within the Mahal".

== Duties ==
Already having been honored by selection for duties within the women's quarters, a mahaldar was exalted above the others for her special services to the emperor. These special services included the management of the other ranking administrators, and reporting conflicts and intrigues from the zenana directly to the Emperor. In that way, she served as a kind of spy on behalf of the Emperor. She was also given the task of reading out daily reports from the public and secret news court writers to the emperor.

== The emperor's spy ==
Often, princes in the royal entourage would avoid the mahaldar, or have ongoing conflicts with her, fearing her reports. One example of this is Hamida Banu, mahaldar in the mahal of Mohammad Muazzam, who complained to the Emperor, Aurangzeb that his son was undermining her authority by confiscating her pen-case and memorandum-book, when he retired to his room with his women. Court custom dictated that she and her deputy could not follow him into the room to retrieve her items during this business. This kept her from documenting whatever he was doing, and prevented her from reporting to the Emperor. Aurangzeb ordered her to keep her pen-case away from the reach of the prince at all times.

In another instance, Nur-un-Nisa, mahaldar to the prince Muhammad Azam, was prohibited from joining the prince on his visits to the garden at Ahmedabad. In response, she sent a letter to his Nazir, forbidding the prince from leaving. Muhammad Azam retaliated by banishing her from his presence. The chief eunuch then alerted the emperor to the situation, and Aurangzeb supported the mahaldar and nazir. His son was forced to beg for forgiveness, and paid a fine of 50,000 Rupees.

== Notable Mahaldars ==
During Jahangir's reign this post was held by a certain lady named Dilaram, who had nursed Empress Nur Jahan in her childhood. Previously this post was held by Haji Koka. In Shah Jahan's reign, this post was held by Sati-un-Nisa Khanum.
