= Indrani Chatterjee =

Indian-American professor of history

- Occupations: Historian, academic, and author
- Awards: Srikant Dutt Book Award for Forgotten Friends, Nehru Memorial Library; Senior Fellowship, American Council of Learned Societies

Academic background
- Education: St. Stephen's College, Delhi University; Jawaharlal Nehru University; School of Oriental and African Studies, University of London

Indrani Chatterjee is an Indian-American historian, academic, and author. She is the John L. Nau III Distinguished Professor of the History and Principles of Democracy at the University of Virginia. She is known for writing about underexplored themes in South Asia’s past —including slavery, the household, and monasticism.

Chatterjee is the author and editor of four books, Gender, Slavery and Law in Colonial India, Unfamiliar Relations: Family and History in South Asia, Slavery and South Asian History, and Forgotten Friends: Monks, Marriages, and Memories of Northeast India.

== Education ==
Chatterjee studied at Delhi University, and received her Bachelor’s and Master’s degrees in History at St. Stephen's College of the University of Delhi in 1982 and 1984, respectively. She earned an M. Phil. Degree in History at Jawaharlal Nehru University in 1987. She earned her Ph.D. in History at the University of London in 1996. Her doctoral dissertation was titled "Slavery, Household and the Law in Colonial India, 1776-1833".

== Career ==
Chatterjee began her academic career as a lecturer of history in Miranda House at Delhi University in 1986. She worked there till 1993 when she took study leave to write her Ph.D. She returned to Miranda House in 1996 for a year. She secured a postdoctoral fellowship at the Maulana Abul Kalm Azad Institute in Kolkata in 1997. In 2001, she held an appointment as the Raoul Wallenberg Assistant Professor at Rutgers, The State University of New Jersey. She worked as associate professor there from 2002 till 2013. Following this appointment, she joined UT Austin as a professor of history. Since 2023, she has been a professor at the University of Virginia.

== Works ==
Chatterjee has focused her research on themes related to slavery, monasticism, and the household in the context of South Asia's past. She also works extensively to reappraise gender and sexuality as frameworks within South Asian History.

Chatterjee's first book, Gender, Slavery and Law in Colonial India, explores the intersections between kinship, dependence, and enslavement complexities that lead to a more nuanced appreciation of slave agency and subalternity. Judith Walsh describes the book as "focused on contemporary company and governmental records, laws related to slavery, and the role of East India Company in terms of manipulating and reinterpreting indigenous slave institutions in ways considered appropriate to British laws regarding marriage and kinship." Chatterjee published a book in 2004, and highlighted how "local narratives, both in what they silenced and in what they expressed, shaped how families understood and represented themselves." Malavika Kasturi is of the view that the significance of Chatterjee's work lie in the questions that it addresses regarding the longue durée history of family, and the ways in which kinship was constructed in cultural codes, and material power structures.”

Her book Slavery and South Asian History contributes to a rethinking of slavery in world history, and even the category of slavery itself. According to Nile Green, the book highlights the significance of "recognizing the variety of slaveries as precisely that—each 'shaped by a unique conjunction of contingent factors; hence each […] must be placed in its own unique context." Her 2013 book, Forgotten Friends, Monks, Marriages and Memories of Northeast India is reviewed by Ruth Gamble as "a work which has commendable application of historical methodology, and tends to cover a long time frame too, from the early medieval period to the twentieth century."

Chatterjee's project Slaves, Souls and Subjects in South Asia highlights occluded history of slavery in South Asia in the late nineteenth and early twentieth centuries. It also emphasizes on the existence of war-captives and bonded debtors that reside in local societies on the borders between India and Burma. In another project titled The Widows’ Might: Lay-Monastic Partnerships and Colonial Capitalism in Nineteenth-Century India, she has provided outlines of fortified monastic warehouses at key sites in eastern India in the late eighteenth century. While giving insights on the studies related to abolition in the subcontinent, she stated that "trans-oceanic histories are not separable from the domain of colonial fiscal or revenue policies." She also discussed the history of property in the subcontinent specifically in relation to slaves in Muslim households in South Asia.

== Awards and honors ==
- 1993-96 - Felix Scholarship to the School of Oriental and African Studies, University of London
- 1994-96 - Overseas Research Students' Grant, Government of Britain
- 1997-1999 - Senior Research Fellowship, Maulana Abul Kalam Azad Institute of Asian Studies, Calcutta.
- 2004-05 - ACLS, Frederick Burkhardt Fellowship for Recently Tenured Faculty, Institute of Advanced Study, Princeton
- 2009-10 - Award for Scholar-Teacher of the year, Rutgers University
- 2010-2011 - Postdoctoral Fellow, Program in Agrarian Studies, Yale University
- 2009-2014 - Srikant Dutt Book Award for Forgotten Friends, Nehru Memorial Library, New Delhi
- 2016 - Senior Fellowship, American Council of Learned Societies
- 2019-20 - Faculty Fellowship at the Institute of Historical Studies, UT Austin
- 2021-2022 - Raymond Dickson Centennial Endowed Teaching Fellowship, College of Liberal Arts, UT Austin
- 2021-2022 - Fellow of the Earl E. Sheffield Regents Professorship, COLA, UT Austin

== Bibliography ==
=== Books ===
- Gender, Slavery and Law in Colonial India (1999) ISBN 9780195641813
- Unfamiliar Relations: Family and History in South Asia (2004) ISBN 9788178240831
- Slavery and South Asian History (2006) ISBN 9780253116710
- Forgotten Friends: Monks, Marriages, and Memories of Northeast India (2013) ISBN 9780198089223

=== Selected articles ===
- Chatterjee, I. (2016). The locked box in Slavery and Social Death. On Human Bondage: After slavery and social death, 151–166.
- Chatterjee, I. (2018). Afro-Asian capital and its dissolution. Comparative Studies of South Asia, Africa and the Middle East, 38(2), 310–329.
- Chatterjee, I. (2018). Connected histories and the dream of decolonial history. South Asia: Journal of South Asian Studies, 41(1), 69–86.
- Hinchy, J., & Joshi, G. (2021). Towards a more varied picture of slavery: an interview with Indrani Chatterjee on histories of enslavement in South Asia. Journal of global slavery, 6(2), 249–261.
- Hinchy, J., & Joshi, G. (2021). Selective Amnesia and South Asian Histories: An Interview with Indrani Chatterjee. Itinerario, 45(1), 1–16.
