= Taleb Amoli =

Iranian poet (1586–1627)

Muhammad Amoli

Mystic Poet
- Born: 16th century - 1586; Amol, Iran
- Died: 17th century - 1627; Kashmir or Lahore
- Venerated in: Safavid dynasty Mughal Empire
- Influenced: Saib Tabrizi; Nima Yooshij; Indian style
- Tradition or genre: Mystic; Poetry; Mathematician; Calligraphy
- Major works: Poetry Court (Ghazal)

Muhammad Ibn Abdullah Taleb Amoli known as Talib Amuli and Talib Amoli (Persian: طالب آملی, also a.k.a. Ashub, Atash, Taleba and Malek Al Shoara Taleb) (b. Mazandaran 1586 - d. India 1627) Iranian Tabari poet was of the early 17th century. He was the poet laureate of the Mughal emperor Jahangir from 1618 till his death. His poetry is in the “Indian Style” of Persian language. A poetry collection (divan) and the poem Talib and Zohre are the works that are left of him today. He studied mathematics, geometry and philosophy. He was also a calligrapher. Around 1010 AH, he traveled from Amol to Isfahan and from there to Kashan. After Kashan, the Taleb goes to Mashhad and from there to Marv to serve Bektash Khan. The ruler welcomed Taleb at his court. The poet dreamed of going to India. He for some time he lived in Delhi, then in Agra. In the end he ended up at the court of Mirza Ghazi Beg, the Mughal governor of Kandahar.

Taleb played a crucial role in the rapid transformation of poetic style at the beginning of the 17th century. His work gave a free rein to the tendency toward conceptualism (Fantasy) in the “fresh style” (later known as the Indian Style) that had begun to emerge a generation earlier in the poetry of Naẓiri and ʿOrfi. At the same time, he gave a new vitality to conventional images and common idioms by exploring their full figurative implications, a procedure Taleb himself revealingly dubs his ṭarz-e esteʿāre (metaphorical style). Taleb entered Jahangir's service about 1616 and was appointed to the post of poet laureate (Malek osh-Sho'ara) in 1619. His Ghazal poems are very similar to Hafez.

Taleb after poets Ferdowsi and Omar Khayyam, is the third poet in terms of the number of verses among Iranian poets. Taleb, the number of couplets in the published complex is approaching 23,000. Taleb was buried in the compound of the Taj Mahal at Shah Jahan command when he died. Taleb gravesite is unknown.

== See also ==
- List of Persian poets and authors
- Persian literature

== Notes ==
- The Elements of Semantic Ambiguity in the Poetry of Talib Amoli
- Faculty of Literature and Human Sciences - literature.ut.ac
- Network Comprehensive Book Gisoom
