= Daroga =

Mughal and British Raj police officials

Darogas (also spelled darogha or daroghah) were police officials in the Mughal Empire and the British Raj. In the Mughal Empire, a daroga was superintendent of the slaves of a Mughal monarch.

== Duties ==
The darogas served in the armies of Kachhwahas and Mughals; and in accordance with the duties performed by them, the darogas were given various titles like daroga-i-sutarkhana, daroga-i-topkhana, and daroga-i-baroodkhana.

Daroghas answered to district magistrates who were in charge of areas at least 100 square miles (26,000 ha; 64,000 acres); because the magistrates were responsible for such a large area, the daroghas were normally the most powerful local authorities. In some cases, they were in charge of factories. The darogas also had command over the police in rural areas.

=== Female daroga ===
The women assigned to the administration of the imperial zenana, the Mughal harem, were also given the title of darogha. The position was appointed by the emperor himself, and marked a great honor for the woman and her family. Consequently, the women given these posts were chosen because they were well brought up, educated and from respectable families. Asmat Banu Begam, the mother of Empress Nur Jahan, had at one time acted in this role. Female daroghas were tasked with maintaining court etiquette and keeping the peace within the zenana.
