= Antahpura =

Women's quarters of an Indian palace

The antahpura (Sanskrit: अन्तःपुर, romanized: Antaḥpura), also rendered anthapura, was the women's quarters or the royal harem of an Indian palace. It was the suite of apartments that were generally situated in a secluded portion of the palace, reserved for the women of the royal household. It consisted of the king's queens and concubines and was headed by his first queen, who was accorded the highest status.

Several palaces in India contain the antahpura, such as the ones of Hampi and Mysore.

== Literature ==
=== Arthashastra ===
The Arthashastra describes the antahpura to be guarded by eunuchs and include a number of apartments, one within the other. It is stated to comprise a parapet, a ditch, and a main door. The passage of commodities from and to these apartments are stated to be restricted, only allowed within after careful examination.

=== Hindu literature ===
Antahpuras are featured in Hindu texts.

The Ramayana describes the antahpura of the rakshasa king Ravana in Lanka, where he has Sita housed and guarded. The consorts of Dasharatha each had their own apartment in his antahpura in Ayodhya.

The goddess Mahakali is described to reside in the antahpura of her palace in Manidvipa, where she is described to sleep with her consort, Mahashiva.

The Bhagavata Purana describes Krishna sending a Brahmana to send a message to Rukmini in her antahpura in Vidarbha before their elopement.

== See also ==
- Women-only space
