= Harem =

Women's quarters in the traditional house of a Muslim family

A harem or harim (Arabic: حَرِيمٌ, romanized: ḥarīm, lit. 'a sacred inviolable place; female members of the family') is a domestic space that is reserved for the women of the house, especially in a Muslim family. A harem may house a man's wife or wives, their pre-pubescent male sons, unmarried daughters, female domestic servants, and other unmarried female relatives. In the past, during the era of slavery in the Muslim world, harems also housed enslaved concubines. In former times, some harems were guarded by eunuchs who were allowed inside. The structure of the harem and the extent of monogamy or polygyny have varied depending on the family's personalities, socio-economic status, and local customs. Similar institutions have been common in other Mediterranean and West Asian civilizations, especially among royal and upper-class families, and the term is sometimes used in other contexts. In traditional Persian residential architecture, the women's quarters were known as andaruni (Persian: اندرونی, lit. 'inside'), and in the Indian subcontinent as zenana (Urdu: زنانہ, lit. 'of the women').

Although the institution has experienced a sharp decline in the modern era due to a rise in education and economic opportunities for women, as well as the influence of Western culture, the seclusion of women is still practiced in some parts of the world, such as rural Afghanistan and conservative states of the Persian Gulf.

In the West, the harem, often depicted as a hidden world of sexual subjugation where numerous women lounged in suggestive poses, has influenced many paintings, stage productions, films and literary works. Some earlier European Renaissance paintings dating to the 16th century portray the women of the Ottoman harem as individuals of status and political significance. In many periods of Islamic history, individual women in the harem exercised various degrees of political influence, such as the Sultanate of Women in the Ottoman Empire.

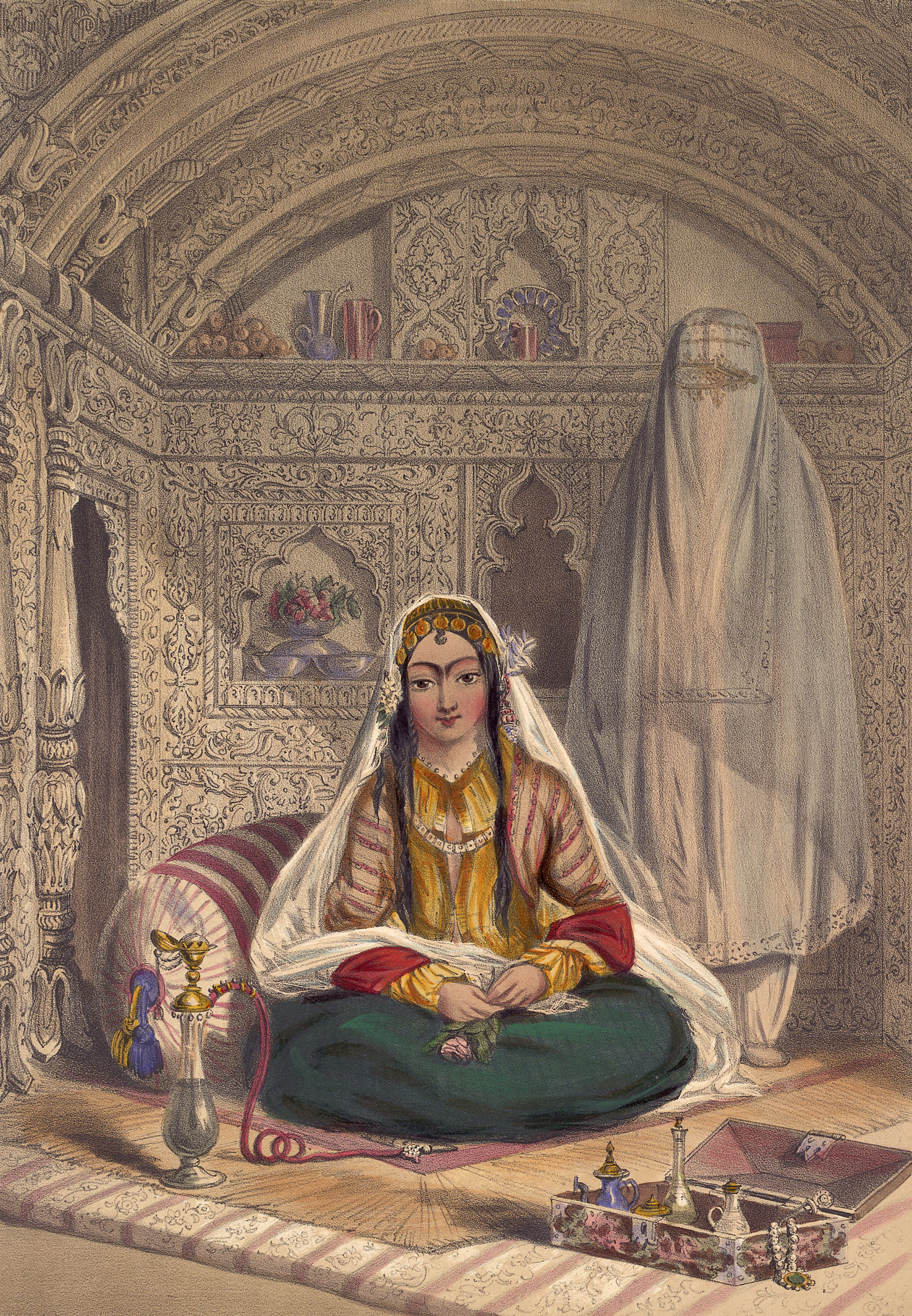
Ladies of Kabul (1848 lithograph, by James Rattray) showing unveiling in zenana areas.

== Terminology ==
The word has been recorded in the English language since the early 17th century. It comes from the Arabic word حَرِيمٌ (ḥarīm), which can mean 'a sacred inviolable place', 'harem' or 'female members of the family'. In English, the term harem can also mean 'the wives (or concubines) of a polygamous man'. The triliteral root Ḥ-R-M appears in other terms related to the notion of interdiction such as haram ('forbidden'), mahram ('unmarriageable relative'), ihram ('a pilgrim's state of ritual consecration during the Hajj') and al-Ḥaram al-Šarīf (Arabic: الحرم الشريف, lit. 'the noble sanctuary', which can refer to the Temple Mount or the sanctuary of Mecca).

In the Ottoman Turkish language, the harem (i.e., the part of the house reserved for women) was called haremlik, while the space open for men was known as selamlık.

The practice of female seclusion is not exclusive to Islam, but the English word harem usually denotes the domestic space reserved for women in Muslim households. Some scholars have used the term to refer to polygynous royal households throughout history.

== Ideal of seclusion ==
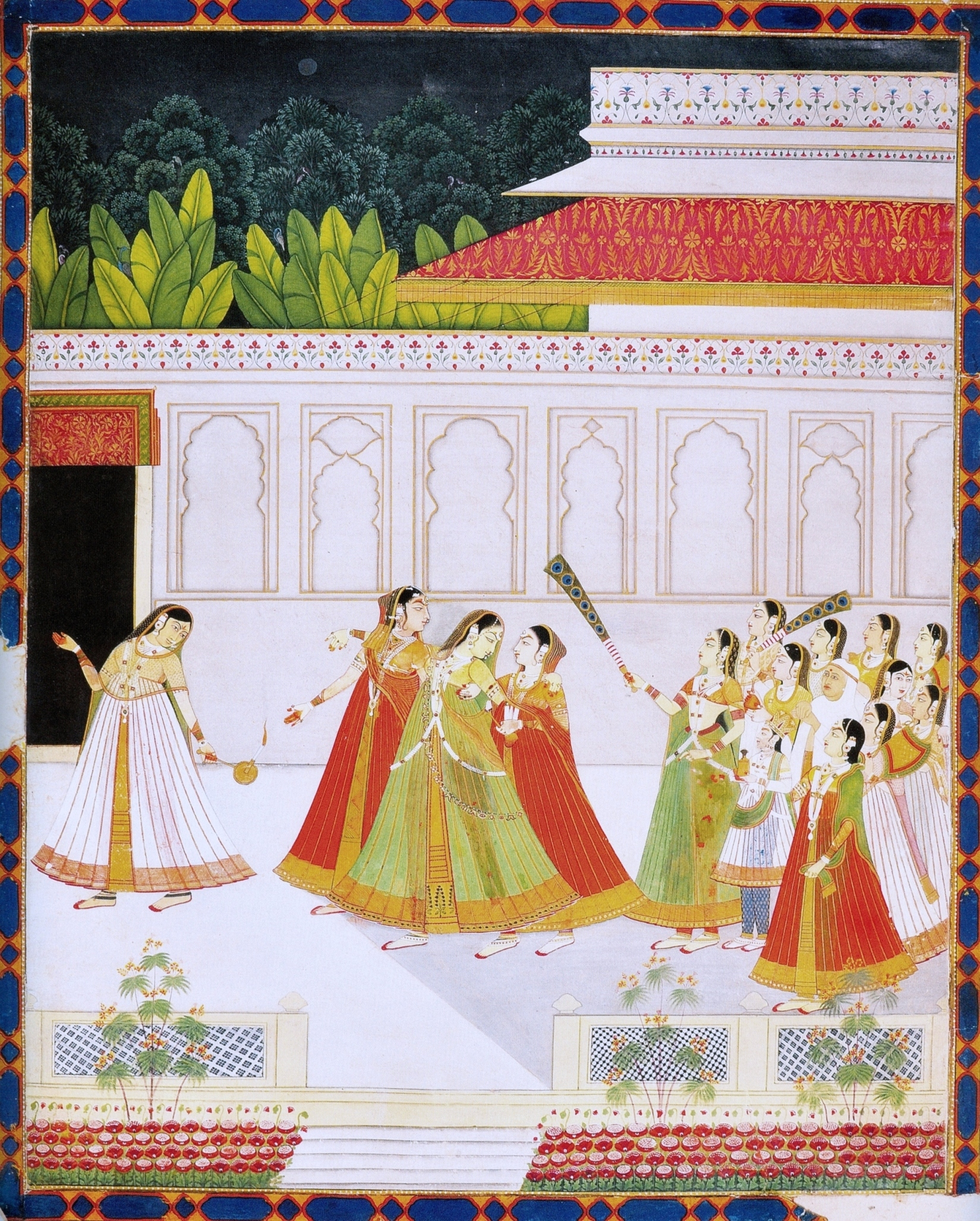
New entrant to a prince's harem. Jaipur, late 18 century, National Museum, New Delhi

Leila Ahmed describes the ideal of seclusion as "a man's right to keep his women concealed—invisible to other men". Ahmed identifies the practice of seclusion as a social ideal and one of the major factors that shaped the lives of women in the Mediterranean West Asia. For example, contemporaneous sources from the Byzantine Empire describe the social norms that governed women's lives. Women were not supposed to be seen in public. They were guarded by eunuchs and could only leave the home "veiled and suitably chaperoned". Some of these customs were borrowed from the Persians, but Greek society also influenced the development of patriarchal tradition.

The ideal of seclusion was not fully realized as social reality. This was in part because working-class women often held jobs that required interaction with men. In the Byzantine Empire, the very ideal of gender segregation created economic opportunities for women as midwives, doctors, bath attendants and artisans since it was considered inappropriate for men to attend to women's needs. At times women lent and invested money, and engaged in other commercial activities. Historical records show that the women of 14th-century Mamluk Cairo freely visited public events alongside men, despite objections of religious scholars.

Female seclusion has historically signaled social and economic prestige. Eventually, the norms of female seclusion spread beyond the elites, but the practice remained characteristic of upper and middle classes, for whom the financial ability to allow one's wife to remain at home was a mark of high status. In some regions, such as the Arabian Peninsula, seclusion of women was practiced by poorer families at the cost of great hardship, but it was generally economically unrealistic for the lower classes.

Where historical evidence is available, it indicates that the harem was much more likely to be monogamous. For example, in late Ottoman Istanbul, only 2.29% of married men were polygynous, with the average number of wives being 2.08. In some regions, like Sub-Saharan Africa and Southeast Asia, prevalence of women in agricultural work leads to wider practice of polygamy but makes seclusion impractical. In contrast, in Eurasian and North African rural communities that rely on male-dominated plough farming, seclusion is economically possible but polygyny is undesirable. This indicates that the fundamental characteristic of the harem is seclusion of women rather than polygyny.

== Pre-Islamic background ==
The idea of the harem or seclusion of women did not originate with Muhammad or Islam. The practice of secluding women was common to many Ancient Near East communities, especially where polygamy was permitted. In pre-Islamic Assyria and Persia, most royal courts had a harem, where the ruler's wives and concubines lived with female attendants, and eunuchs. Encyclopædia Iranica uses the term harem to describe the practices of the ancient Near East.

=== Ancient Egypt ===
There has been a modern trend to refer to the women's quarters of the Pharaoh's palace in Ancient Egypt as a harem.

The popular assumption that Pharaonic Egypt had a harem is however an anachronism; while the women and children of the pharaoh, including his mother, wives, and children, had their own living quarters with its own administration in the Palace of the Pharaoh, the royal women did not live isolated from contact with men or in seclusion from the rest of the court in the way associated with the term harem. The custom of referring to the women's quarters of the pharaoh's palace as a "harem" is therefore apocryphal, and has been used because of incorrect assumptions that Ancient Egypt was similar to later Islamic harem culture.

=== Assyria ===
The kings of Ancient Assyria are known to have had a harem regulated by royal edicts, in which the women lived in seclusion guarded by slave eunuchs.

A number of regulations were designed to prevent disputes among the women from developing into political intrigues. The women were guarded by the eunuchs who also prevented their disputes from developing into political plots; they were banned from giving gifts to their servants (as such gifts could be used as bribes) and were not allowed any visitors who had not been examined and approved by officials. When the king traveled, his harem traveled with him, strictly supervised so as not to break regulations even under transport.

In the 7th century BC, Assyria was conquered by the Median Empire, which appears to have adopted the harem custom. Reportedly, the Median nobility each had five wives, and employed eunuchs (though these eunuchs may have been non-castrated officials).

=== Greece and Byzantium ===
Female seclusion and a special part of the house reserved for women were common among the elites of ancient Greece, where it was known as the gynaeceum (Ancient Greek: γυναικεῖον, gynaikeion). However, while gender segregation was the official ideal in Classical Athens, it is debated how much of this ideal was actually enforced, and it is known that even upper-class women appeared in public and were able to come in contact with men, at least on religious occasions.

These traditional Greek ideals were revived as an ideal for women in the Byzantine Empire (in which Greek culture eventually became dominant), though the rigid idealistic norms of seclusion expressed in Byzantine literature did not necessarily reflect actual practice. The Byzantine Emperors were Greek Orthodox and did not have several wives, or official concubines, secluded in a harem. When Greek culture started to replace the Roman in the Byzantine Empire in the 6th century, it came to be seen as modest, especially for upper-class women, to keep to a special women's quarters (γυναικωνίτης, gynaikonitis), and until the 12th century, men and women are known to have participated in gender-segregated banquets at the Imperial Court; however Imperial women still appeared in public and did not live in seclusion, and the idealized gender segregation was never fully enforced.

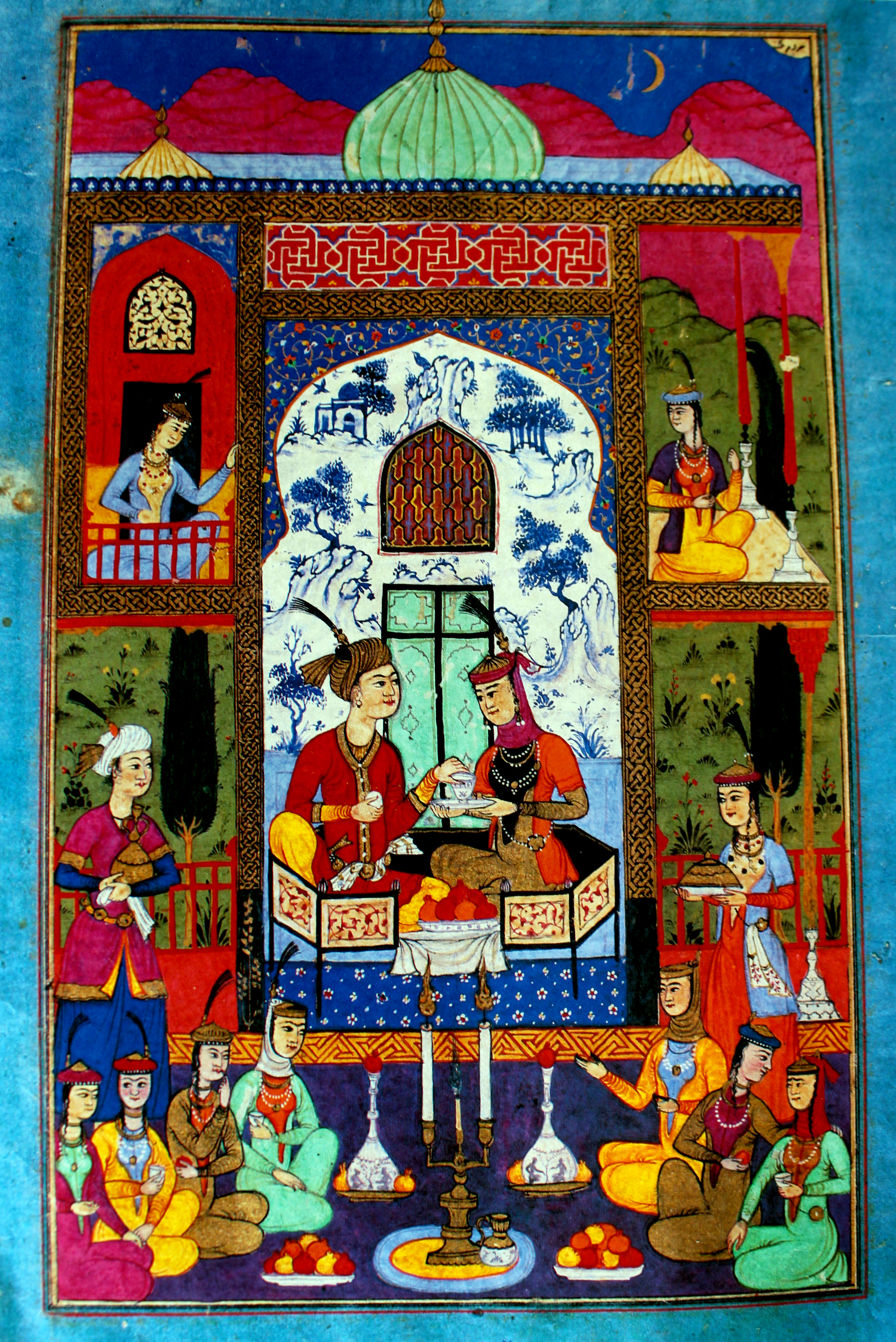
Khosrow and Shirin (Bukhara, 1648)

=== The Median and Achaemenid Empires ===
There is no evidence among early Iranians of harem practices, that is, taking large numbers of wives or concubines and keeping them in seclusion. However, Iranian dynasties are said to have adopted harem practices after their conquests in West Asia, where such practices were used in some cultures such as Assyria (the Median Empire conquered Assyria in the 7th century BC, and Media transformed into the Achaemenid Empire). According to Greek sources, the nobility of the Medes kept no less than five wives, who were watched over by eunuchs.

Greek historians have reported of harems of the Achaemenid Empire. Herodotus reported that each Persian royal or aristocratic man had several wives and concubines who came to the husband on a well-regulated, turn by turn basis and had sole control over their children until they were five years old.

The Old Persian word for the harem is not attested, but it can be reconstructed as xšapā.stāna (lit. night station or place where one spends the night).

The royal household was controlled by the chief wife and queen, who as a rule was the daughter of a Persian prince and mother of the heir to the throne, and who was subject only to the king. She had her own living quarters, revenue, estates and staff, which included eunuchs and concubines. The second rank under the queen consisted of the legal secondary wives, with the title bānūka ('Lady'). The third rank consisted of unmarried princesses as well as married princesses who lived with their own family, with the title duxçī ('daughter'). The fourth group of women in the harem were the royal slave concubines who were bought in slave markets, received as gifts or tribute, or taken as prisoners of war. The concubines were trained to entertain the king and his guests as musicians, dancers, and singers. The harem of Darius III reportedly consisted of his mother, his queen-wife, her children, over 300 concubines and nearly 500 household servants.

However, it is a matter of debate if the Achaemenid court had a full harem culture, as women do not appear to have been fully secluded in the harem. The fact that women lived in separate quarters at the Royal Palace does not necessarily mean that they were secluded from contact with men, and despite the (possibly biased) Greek reports, there is no archeological evidence supporting the existence of a harem, or the seclusion of women from contact with men, at the Achaemenid court.

Royal and aristocratic Achaemenid women were given an education in subjects that did not appear compatible with seclusion, such as horsemanship and archery. It does not appear that royal and aristocratic women lived in seclusion from men since it is known that they appeared in public and traveled with their husbands, participated in hunting and in feasts; at least the chief wife of a royal or aristocratic man did not live in seclusion, as it is clearly stated that wives customarily accompanied their husbands to dinner banquets, although they left the banquet when the "women entertainers" of the harem came in and the men began "merrymaking".

Little is known about the alleged harems of the Parthians. Parthian royal men reportedly had several wives and kept them fairly secluded from all men except for relatives and eunuchs. According to Roman sources, Parthian kings had harems full of female slaves and hetairas secluded from contact with men, and royal women were not allowed to participate in the royal banquets. Also aristocratic Parthian men appear to have had harems, as Roman sources report of rich men travelling with hundreds of guarded concubines. However, the Roman reports about Parthian harems seem to mirror the traditional Greek reports about the Achaemenid harems, and they similarly are biased, and cannot be verified by archeological evidence.

=== Sasanian Empire ===
The information about the Sasanian harem reveals a picture that closely mirrors the alleged Achaemenid customs. In the Sasanian Empire, Roman reports say that it was common for men to have multiple wives. The hierarchy of the Sasanian harem is not clear. The Sasanian kings had one chief consort, who was the mother of the heir to the throne, as well as several wives of lower rank, and concubines, all of whom accompanied him on travels and even on campaigns.

Five titles are attested to for royal women: "royal princess" (duxšy, duxt); "Lady" (bānūg); "Queen" (bānbišn); "Queen of the Empire" ([Ērān]šahr bānbišn) and "Queen of Queens" (bānbišnān bānbišn). The rank of these titles has been a matter of debate and it appears that their status varied depending on circumstances and that the highest female rank was not necessarily borne by the chief wife, but could be held by a daughter or a sister. The Sasanian harem was supervised by eunuchs, and also had female singers and musicians.

However, while the Sasanian kings had harems, Women in the Sasanian Empire in general did not live in seclusion; elaborate harems were detested and appear to have been exceptions to the rule, which is illustrated by the fact that big harems — when they occurred — were abhorred by the public.

According to Sasanian legend, of all the Persian kings, Khosrow II was the most extravagant in his hedonism. He searched his realm to find the most beautiful girls, and it was rumored that about 3,000 of them were kept in his harem. This practice was widely condemned by the public, who abhorred the fact that he kept the women in seclusion, denying them the benefit of marriage and progeny; this was counted as the fourth of the eight crimes for which he was later tried and executed. Khosrow himself claimed that he sent his favorite wife Shirin every year with an offer of the possibility of leaving his harem with a dowry for marriage, but that their luxurious lifestyle always prompted the women and girls to refuse his offer.

=== South Asia ===
South Asian traditions of female seclusion, called purdah, may have been influenced by Islamic customs. Ashoka, the emperor of the Maurya Empire in India, kept a harem of around 500 women, all of whom were under strict rules of seclusion and etiquette.

== In Islamic cultures ==
=== Umayyad and Abbasid Caliphates ===
In contrast to the earlier era of the Islamic prophet Muhammad and the Rashidun Caliphate, women in Umayyad and Abbasid society were absent from all arenas of the community's central affairs. It was very common for early Muslim women to play an active role in community life and even to lead men into battle and start rebellions, as demonstrated in the Hadith literature. But by the time of the Abbasid Caliphate, women were ideally kept in seclusion.

The practice of gender segregation in Islam was influenced by an interplay of religion, customs and politics.The harem system first became fully institutionalized in the Islamic world under the Abbasid caliphate. Seclusion of women was established in various communities of the Mediterranean, Mesopotamia, and Persia before the advent of Islam, and some scholars believe that Muslims adopted the custom from the Byzantine Empire and Persia, retrospectively interpreting the Quran to justify it. Although the term harem does not denote women's quarters in the Quran, a number of Quranic verses discussing modesty and seclusion were held up by Quranic commentators as religious rationale for the separation of women from men, including the so-called hijab verse (33:53). In modern usage hijab colloquially refers to the religious attire worn by Muslim women, but in this verse, it meant 'veil' or 'curtain' that physically separates female from male space. Although classical commentators agreed that the verse spoke about a curtain separating the living quarters of Muhammad's wives from visitors to his house, they usually viewed this practice as providing a model for all Muslim women.

The growing seclusion of women was illustrated by the power struggle between the Caliph Al-Hadi and his mother Al-Khayzuran, who refused to live in seclusion but instead challenged the power of the Caliph by giving her own audiences to male supplicants and officials and thus mixing with men. Her son considered this improper, and he publicly addressed the issue of his mother's public life by assembling his generals and asked them:

'Who is the better among us, you or me?' asked Caliph al-Hadi of his audience.
'Obviously you are the better, Commander of the Faithful,' the assembly replied.
'And whose mother is the better, mine or yours?' continued the caliph.
'Your mother is the better, Commander of the Faithful.'
'Who among you', continued al-Hadi, 'would like to have men spreading news about your mother?'
'No one likes to have his mother talked about,' responded those present.
'Then why do men go to my mother to speak to her?'

Conquests had brought enormous wealth and large numbers of slaves to the Muslim elite. The majority of the slaves were women and children, many of whom had been dependents or harem-members of the defeated Sasanian upper classes. In the wake of the conquests, an elite man could potentially own a thousand slaves, and ordinary soldiers could have ten people serving them.

Nabia Abbott, preeminent historian of elite women of the Abbasid Caliphate, describes the lives of harem women as follows:

The choicest women were imprisoned behind heavy curtains and locked doors, the strings and keys of which were entrusted into the hands of that pitiable creature – the eunuch. As the size of the harem grew, men indulged to satiety. Satiety within the individual harem meant boredom for the one man and neglect for the many women. Under these conditions ... satisfaction by perverse and unnatural means crept into society, particularly in its upper classes.

The marketing of human beings, particularly women, as objects for sexual use meant that elite men owned the vast majority of women they interacted with, and related to them as would masters to slaves. Being a slave meant relative lack of autonomy, and belonging to a harem caused a wife and her children to have little insurance of stability and continued support due to the volatile politics of harem life.

Elite men expressed in literature the horror they felt for the humiliation and degradation of their daughters and female relatives. For example, the verses addressed to Hasan ibn al-Firat on the death of his daughter read:

To Abu Hassan I offer condolences.
At times of disaster and catastrophe
God multiplies rewards for the patient.
To be patient in misery
Is equivalent to giving thanks for a gift.
Among the blessings of God undoubtedly
Is the preservation of sons
And the death of daughters.

Courtesans and princesses produced poetry. Enough survives to give us access to women's historical experiences, and records unique figures such as: the Sufi mystic Raabi'a al-Adwiyya (714–801 CE), the princess and poet 'Ulayya bint al-Mahdi (777–825 CE), the singing-girls Shāriyah (c. 815–70 CE), Fadl Ashsha'ira (d. 871 CE) and Arib al-Ma'muniyya (797–890 CE).

=== Al-Andalus ===
The harem system that developed in the Umayyad and Abbasid Caliphates was reproduced by the Islamic realms developing from them, such as in the Emirates and Caliphates in Muslim Spain, al-Andalus, which attracted a lot of attention in Europe during the Middle Ages until the Emirate of Granada was conquered in 1492.

==== Caliphate of Cordoba ====
The most famous of the Andalusian harems was perhaps the harem of the Caliph of Cordoba. Except for the female relatives of the Caliph, the harem women consisted of his slave concubines. The slaves of the Caliph were often European saqaliba slaves trafficked from Northern or Eastern Europe. While male saqaliba could be given work in a number offices such as: in the kitchen, falconry, mint, textile workshops, the administration or the royal guard (in the case of harem guards, they were castrated), but female saqaliba were placed in the harem.

The harem could contain thousands of slave concubines; the harem of Abd al-Rahman I consisted of 6,300 women. The saqaliba concubines were appreciated for their light skin. The concubines (jawaris) were educated in accomplishments to make them attractive and useful for their master, and many became known and respected for their knowledge in a variety of subjects from music to medicine. A jawari concubine who gave birth to a child attained the status of an umm walad, and a favorite concubine was given great luxury and honorary titles such as in the case of Marjan, who gave birth to al-Hakam II, the heir of Abd al-Rahman III; he called her al-sayyida al-kubra ('the great lady'). Several concubines were known to have had great influence through their masters or their sons, notably Subh during the Caliphate of Cordoba, and Isabel de Solís during the Emirate of Granada.

However, concubines were always slaves subjected the will of their master. Caliph Abd al-Rahman III is known to have executed two concubines for reciting what he saw as inappropriate verses, and tortured another concubine with a burning candle in her face while she was held by two eunuchs after she refused sexual intercourse. The concubines of Abu Marwan al-Tubni (d. 1065) were reportedly so badly treated that they conspired to murder him; women of the harem were also known to have been subjected to rape when rivaling factions conquered different palaces.

==== Almoravid Empire ====
As was common in Islamic dynasties, the Royal Almoravid Household were largerly staffed with slaves. Both Black (African) and white (North Spanish) slaves are noted among the court slaves. Al-Bakri (c. 1040–1094) described how excellent trained cooks and light skinned girls for concubinage were sold on the slave market in Awdaghust. The Almoravid royalty and aristocracy used slaves as agrigultural laborers, for military use as slave soldiers, and for sexual use as concubines. Slaves were given away as gifts between members of the Almoravid dynasty: the Amir Yusuf ibn Tashfin, for example, are known to have given slaves as material gifts to his cousin Abu Bakr ibn Umar.

Slave eunuchs, who could work both in the Royal Almoravid Harem as well as the rest of the Royal Household, were popular as courtiers and high court offices such as the hujjab office (chamberlain); eunuchs were formally known as khasi, but were normally referred to with the neutral euphemism khadim, which was used for all court officials.

As was common for Islamic dynasties, the Almoravid dynasty used slave concubines for procration, a method that kept the royal dynasty free from potential complications with in-laws and from uniting the royal dynasty to another family line. In Islam, the child of a slave and her enslaver were counted as legitimate despite being born outside of marriage, as long as the father acknowledged paternity, in which case the slave mother was given the position umm walad and automatically manumitted on the death of her enslaver.

As per Islamic law, which permitted Muslims to enslave kafirs (non-Muslims), the concubines were slave girls captured during slave raids or military campaigns across the borders with non-Muslim lands (dar al-harb), such as Christian North Spain or Pagan Africa South of Sahara. The slave girls were divided as war booty among the participators of the raids or campaigns, or sold in the slave market bazaar.

Upon arrival to the Royal Almoravid Harem, the slave girl were converted to Islam and given a slave name; unless she managed to attract the attention of the enslaver, she would serve only as a house slave of the harem or be sold on to the slave market. If she was selected for sexual slavery as a concubine, she could give birth to the next heir to the throne. Many Almoravid princes and monarchs are known to have Christian (European) slave mothers. The Almoravid Royal Harem had many examples of concubines and mothers of rulers who exerted great influence, and were later to be criticised by their successor the Almohads for allowing women too much influence.

==== Almohad Caliphate ====
The staff of the royal Almohad household were normally slaves or former slaves. Both Black (African) and white (North Spanish) slaves are noted among the court slaves. African male slaves were used for the Almohad royal bodyguard, called hasham or abid al-makhzan. Male slave servants of the royal household were often eunuchs (khasi): however, it is debated how common they were, since both eunuchs were politely referred to by the neutral term khadim, which was a term used for all court slaves, regardless if they had been castrated or not. Eunuchs were popular since they were able to serve in both the male part of the royal household was well as the harem, and viewed as loyal since they lacked family, and they were often filled the high court offices, such as the hujjab office (chamberlain).

Eunuchs and female slaves were used as staff inside the Caliphal Almohad harem. Similar to other Islamic dynasties, the Almohad dynasty used slave concubines for procreation, since this method kept the royal dynasty separate from social and political entanglement with other family lines. Initially, the concubines of the Almohad dynasty were often Muslims. Islamic law prohibited Muslims from enslaving fellow Muslims, but the Almohads were adherents of a new sect of Islam, Almohadism, and considered other Muslims to not be true Muslims and therefore legitimate to enslave. The Almohad dynasty captured many women and girls during their conquest of the Almoravid empire, who were divided among the conquerors and made concubines. Caliph Abd al-Mu'min collected a large harem of women captives who became the mothers of his children; these women were too many for the Caliph to marry and would have been his concubines. Only one woman in his harem, Safiyya bint Abi Imran, are clearly stated to be a free woman and his legal wife, and she is the only woman named by name except for Fatima of Fez, who was the mother of his son Abu al-Hasan Ali.

After the Almohad conquest however, the Almohad dynasty started to acquire slave concubines in the same way as other Islamic dynasties by import of kafir slave girls from dar al-Harb; the slave girls were captured alongside borders to non-Muslim lands, and the concubines to the Almohad harem were often captured from military campaigns or slave raids to Christian North Spain or Pagan Africa South of Sahara. The slave girls were divided as war booty among the participators of the raids or campaigns, or sold in the slave market bazaar.

Slave girls were normally converted to Islam after their capture. After having entered the royal harem, the concubine were forced to attract the interest of the Caliph in order to advance in hierarchy and avoid to continue to work as a domestic slave maidservant of the harem, or being sold on. In Islam, the child of a slave and her enslaver were counted as legitimate despite being born outside of marriage, as long as the father acknowledged paternity, in which case the slave mother was given the position umm walad and automatically manumitted on the death of her enslaver. Concubines could attain great influence due to their closeness to the Caliph and as mothers of the next Caliph. When Idris al-Ma'mun died in 1232, his Christian consort Habbaba called upon the Christian slave soldiers and informed them about the death of the Caliph before she informed the Muslim courtiers, thereby giving her fellow Christians an advantage in the ensuing power struggle during the succession.

==== Emirate of Granada ====
The rulers of the Nasrid dynasty of the Emirate of Granada (1232–1492) customarily married their cousins, but also kept slave concubines in accordance with Islamic custom. The identity of these concubines is unknown, but they were originally Christian women (rūmiyyas) bought or captured in expeditions in the Christian states of Northern Spain, and given a new name when they entered the royal harem.

The Royal Nasrid Harem of the Emirate of Granada (1238–1492) was modelled after the former Royal Harem of Cordoba. The rulers of the Nasrid dynasty normally married their cousins (al-hurra), who became their legal wives (zawŷ), but additionally bought enslaved concubines (ŷawārī, mamlūkāt); the concubines were normally Christian girls (rūmiyyas) kidnapped in slave raids to the Christian lands in the North. A concubine who gave birth to a child who was recognized by her enslaver as his, was given the status of ummahāt al-awlād, which meant she could no longer be sold and would be free (hurra) after the death of her enslaver. The mothers of both Yusuf I and Muhammad V had been captured Christian women, as had Rīm, enslaved by Yusuf I of Granada, and mother of Ismail II of Granada.

=== 'Alawi dynasty of Morocco ===
The Royal harem of the Alaouite dynasty of Morocco has historically not been the subject of much research. Known from the 17th century onward, the royal harem is known to have followed the common model of a royal Muslim harem, including wives, enslaved concubines, female slave-servants and enslaved eunuchs as guards and officials.

The rulers of the Alaouite dynasty often conducted political marriages, cementing strategic alliances with internal tribal and aristocratic men by marrying female members of their family. Aside from their legal wives, they also, similar to other Muslim rulers, followed the custom of having concubines. The enslaved concubines of the Alaouite dynasty famously often came from the Barbary slave trade, as well as from the Trans-Saharan slave trade. It was not unheard of for a ruler to marry one of his concubines. Many slaves were also provided to the harem from Africa via the Trans-Saharan slave trade. This was particularly true about the enslaved maidservants, as well as the eunuchs.

The Alaouite harem is most known during the reign of Moulay Ismail, Alaouite sultan of Morocco from 1672 to 1727. Moulay Ismail had over 500 enslaved concubines. He is said to have fathered a total of 525 sons and 342 daughters by 1703 and achieved a 700th son in 1721.

Many of his concubines are only fragmentarily documented. As concubines, they were slave captives, sometimes acquired via the Barbary slave trade from Europe. One of them, an Irishwoman by the name Mrs. Shaw, was brought to his harem after having been enslaved. She was forced to convert to Islam when the Sultan wished to have intercourse with her, but was manumitted and married off to a Spanish convert when the Sultan grew tired of her. The Spanish convert being very poor, witnesses described her as being reduced to beggary. Other slave concubines would become favorites and thus allowed some influence, such as an Englishwoman called Lalla Balqis. Another favorite was a Spanish captive renamed Al-Darah, mother to Moulay Ismail's once favorite sons Moulay Mohammed al-Alim; and Moulay Sharif, whom he, himself educated. Around 1702, Al-Darah was strangled by Moulay Ismail; Lalla Aisha Mubaraka, a later favorite, convinced him that Al-Darah had betrayed him; she wanted to secure the succession of her own son.

According to the writings of the French diplomat Dominique Busnot, Moulay Ismail had at least 500 concubines and even more children. A total of 868 children (525 sons and 343 daughters) is recorded in 1703, with his seven-hundredth son being born shortly after his death in 1727, by which time he had well over a thousand children. The final total is uncertain; the Guinness Book of Records claims 1042, while Elisabeth Oberzaucher and Karl Grammer of the University of Vienna put the total at 1171. This is widely considered to be the largest number of children of any human in history.

A French diplomat who visited the court of Molay Islam in 1712 reported that the senior wife of the Sultan was in charge of the supervision of the harem concubines. The concubines were kept secluded in separate cells in the palace harem; they were given one slave maid and one slave eunuch each, but were kept under such tight seclusion that they were rarely allowed to visit even each other; fourteen concubines were reportedly punished by having their teeth pulled out for visiting each other without permission. The slave concubines brought to the Palace harem were normally kept there until they age of thirty, after which the Sultan normally got rid of them.

The slave trade to the Royal Harem decreased after the end of the Barbary slave trade in the early 19th century. White concubines were however still provided via the Circassian slave trade during the 19th century. In the early 20th century, African slaves also decreased due to the end of the Trans-Saharan slave trade, which was forced closed by the Spanish and French colonial authorities in the 1920s. However, descendants of slaves continued to work as servants and concubines of the Royal Harem in the 20th century.

The traditional Royal Harem still existed during the reign of king Hassan II of Morocco (r. 1961–1999): the Royal Harem included forty personal concubines (who by Islamic law were by definition slaves) as well as an additional forty concubines who the king had inherited by his father; additional concubines who worked as domestic servants in the Royal Harem, as well as male slaves performing other positions such as chauffeurs in the Royal Household. The slaves of the Royal Household were descended from enslaved ancestors inherited within the household. The Royal Harem was dissolved by Mohammed VI of Morocco when he ascended to the throne in 1999.

=== Afghanistan ===
The Barakzai dynasty rulers of Afghanistan (1823–1973) customarily had a harem of four official wives as well as a large number of unofficial wives for the sake of tribal marriage diplomacy.

In addition, they also had enslaved harem women known as kaniz ('slave girl') and surati or surriyat ('mistress'), guarded by the ghulam bacha (eunuchs). Habibullah Khan (r. 1901–1919) famously had at least 44 wives and hundreds of slave women (mostly Hazara) in his harem in the Harem Sara Palace. The women of the royal harem dressed in Western fashion as far back as the reign Habibullah Khan, but did not show themselves other than completely covered outside of the enclosed area of the royal palace.

The royal harem was first abolished by king Amanullah Khan, who in 1923 freed all slaves of the royal harem as well as encouraging his wife, queen Soraya Tarzi, and the other women of the royal family to unveil and live public lives. While the royal women returned to the purdah of the royal complex after the deposition of Amanullah in 1929, it was dissolved with the final unveiling of the royal women in 1959.

=== Ayyubid Sultanate ===
The royal harem of the Ayyubid dynasty of Egypt and the Levant (1171–1250) was similar to its predecessor, the Fatimid harem.

The wives and mothers and female relatives of the Ayyubid sultans are rarely known in more detail. In some cases, the Ayyubid sultans married free Muslim women: Sultan Saladin was married to several wives, the best-known of whom was Ismat ad-Din Khatun, and Sultan Al-Kamil was married to Sitti Sawda. However, in most cases it appears the Sultans preferred to use slave concubines for procreation.

Non-Muslim female slaves were imported as kafirs (infidels) from dar al-harb (the non-Muslim world) and forced to convert to Islam upon arrival. In the harem, female slaves would work as servants or chosen for sexual slavery as concubines. Some slave-girls were trained in accomplishments of the arts to perform as qiyan entertainers, and some of the most favored royal Ayyubid concubines had been qiyan artists, such as Surur and Adschība.

A sultan did not have to marry, and some of them did not. Instead, they procreated via concubines. A concubine who had given birth to a child whose paternity was acknowledged by the sultan, was raised to the status of umm al-walad, and as the mother of a royal child was considered a true member of the royal dynasty. The sultan could manumit and marry a concubine, but it was not necessary for him to do so, since by Islamic law, the son of a concubine was legitimate if his father acknowledged paternity. The most famous member of the Ayyubid harem was Shajar al-Durr, who entered as a slave concubine, was manumitted by the birth of an acknowledged child and, in a unique case, conquered the throne after the death of her former enslaver.

The wife or concubine who had given birth to the designated heir to the throne had the highest rank of the harem. Aside from the female slaves, the women of the harem were assisted by eunuchs.

=== Brunei ===
Historically, the Royal harem of the sultan of Brunei included both wives as well as female enslaved concubines and servants. Slaves in Brunei were often non-Muslim Javanese, brought to Brunei by merchants.

The royal harem were described by a British resident in the 1850s as an institution where the women were isolated from the outside world to such a degree that the sultan preferred to attend to the repairs of the building himself, assisted by female slaves:

"The harem of the Brunei sultan is no splendid abode. It reminds one rather of a barn than of Haroun Alraschid's palace. In a building some seventy feet by forty, fourscore women live-wives, concubines, and slaves. I do not know that any white person has beheld the inside of it, for his majesty carries jealous care to the verge of hypochondria [...] Putting aside the prosaic question of securing a good meal every day, inmates of a royal harem who receive but one set of clothes a year - and those of cotton or cheapest silk - will always be plotting to get finery and cash. The house is old, constantly needing repair, and the sultan will not allow even a carpenter to go inside it. [...] The old monarch handled tools himself, assisted by the female slaves.".

Slavery was abolished in Brunei in 1928.

=== Crimean Khanate ===
In the Muslim dynasties of Central Asia, the harem culture did not initially exist, since the customary nomadic culture made it impractical. The wives of the rulers of the Golden Horde did not live secluded in a harem but were allowed to show themselves and meet men who were not their relatives. The system of harem gender segregation was not fully implemented in the Islamic dynasties of Central Asia until they stopped living a nomadic lifestyle, such as in the Crimea.

The household organization of the khans of the Giray dynasty in the Crimean Khanate was described first during the reign of Sahib I Giray; most court offices were initiated by Sahib I Giray. It is clear that there were separate women's quarters in the court of Sahib I Giray, however complete gender segregation in the form of a harem does not appear to have been introduced until the 1560s.

The Giray court appears to have been organized in the slave-household manner that was normal in other Muslim dynasties. Many of the officials and courtiers (such as the viziers and equerries) as well as the servants were enslaved, while some were free Muslim noble clients and ulema family members. However, the servants of the royal harem were definitely slaves, including the eunuchs of Black African origin, taken from Africa via the Ottoman slave trade and the Middle East, who guarded the harem and who were often trained in the Ottoman Imperial harem.

Inside the harem, the highest positions were that of ana biyim and ulug biyim (ulug hani), which were given to the khan's mother and to the khan's first wife or the eldest Giray princess, respectively. The royal women had their own property and administered it from the harem through their legal agents, known as vekils, who also acted as their intermediaries with supplicants and petitioners.

The princes and the khans normally married free Muslim daughters of the Circassian vassal begs and trusted high officials; the khans also customarily practiced levirate marriage. Similar to what was normal in the royal harem of other Islamic dynasties, the khans had four official wives (all with their own separate quarters within the harem), and an unknown number of enslaved concubines. In 1669, the khan reportedly received fifteen Circassian slave virgins as an annual tribute from his subjects in the Caucasus; in the 1720s khan Saadet Giray reportedly owned twenty-seven slave concubines, and in the 1760s khan Qirim Giray owned about forty. But not all slave concubines were Circassians. Some royal children are recorded to have been born by slave mothers from Central and Eastern Europe; the occurrence of European women in the royal harem diminished in the 18th century when the Crimean slave raids to Eastern Europe (and thus the Crimean slave trade) were suppressed. Some of these women, though all formally concubines, would not have been the khan's concubines in practice, instead acting as the servants of his wives. This was the case in the Royal Ottoman harem as well, which served as the role model of the Giray harem. The Giray princesses were normally married off to poor noblemen and vassals who would be provided with great dowries, putting the princesses in an advantageous position over their husbands, thus causing the husbands to be loyal to the Girays.

Initially, the royal women did not live in seclusion in the harem. Notably, they gave their own audiences to men, such as during the ceremonial visit of the Russian ambassador, who would present them with diplomatic gifts. But in 1564, the Russian ambassador was given the message that such audiences were no longer allowed. The Giray women did continue to play a role in diplomacy, however, since they were allowed to exchange formal diplomatic correspondence with female rulers and consorts. Ğazı II Giray assigned his wife Han Tokai to act as a mediator and write to Tsaritsa Irina Godunova, while he himself wrote to Tsar Feodor I, negotiating the return of their son Murad Giray from Moscow in 1593.

There are a few examples of politically active and influential women of the Giray harem: Nur Sultan, wife of Mengli I Giray, Ayse Sultan, wife of Devlet I Giray (r. 1551–1577) and Emine Sultan Biyim, wife of Mehmed IV Giray (1642–44 and 1654–66), have been historically acknowledged as politically influential.

=== Fatimid Caliphate ===
The Fatimid Caliphate (909–1171) built upon the established model of the Abbasid harem.

The highest ranked woman in the Fatimid harem were normally the mother of the Caliph, or alternatively the mother of the heir or a female relative, who was given the title sayyida or al-sayyida al-malika ('queen').

The consorts of the Caliph were originally slave-girls whom the Caliph either married or used as concubines (sex slaves); in either case, a consort of the Caliph were referred to as jiha or al-jiha al-aliya ('Her Highness'). The concubines of the Fatimid Caliphs were in most cases of Christian origin, described as beautiful singers, dancers and musicians; they were often the subject of love poems, but also frequently accused of manipulating the Caliph. The third rank harem women were slave-girls trained in singing, dancing and playing music to perform as entertainers; this category were sometimes given as diplomatic gifts between male power holders.

The lowest rank of harem women were the slave girls selected to become servants and performed a number of different tasks in the harem and royal household; these women were called shadadat and had some contact with the outside world, as they trafficked goods from the outside world to the harem via the underground tunnels known as saradib. In 1122, there were six lady treasurers (khuzzan), and during the reign of al-Hafiz a woman, Sitt Ghazal, were appointed supervisor of the caliphal inkwell (dawa), an office otherwise always held by men.

Ibn Muyassar described a hall of relaxation used by vizier al-Afdal with a line of mechanic mannequins (siwar) facing each other at the entrance: four depicting white slave girls made of camphor, and four depicting black slave girls made of amber, who bowed down when the vizier entered the room, and raised their heads when he sat down.

The enslaved eunuchs managed the women of the harem, guarded them, informed them and reported on them to the Caliph, and acted as their link to the outside world.

=== Mamluk Sultanate ===
The harem of the Mamluk sultans was housed in the Cairo Citadel al-Hawsh in the capital of Cairo (1250–1517).

The Mamluk sultanate built upon the established model of the Abbasid harem, as did its predecessor the Fatimid harem. The mother of the sultan was the highest ranked woman of the harem. The consorts of the Sultans of the Bahri dynasty (1250–1382) were originally slave girls. The female slaves were supplied to the harem by the slave trade as children; they could be trained to perform as singers and dancers in the harem, and some were selected to serve as concubines (sex slaves) of the Sultan, who in some cases chose to marry them. Other slave girls served the consorts of the Sultan in a number of domestic tasks as harem servants, known as qahramana or qahramaniyya. The harem was guarded by enslaved eunuchs, until the 15th century supplied by the Balkan slave trade and then from the Black Sea slave trade, served as the officials of the harem.

The harem of the Bahri Mamluk sultans were initially small and moderate, but Sultan Al-Nasir Muhammad (r. 1293–1341) expanded the harem to a major institution, which came to consummate as much luxury and slaves as the infamously luxurious harem of the preceding Fatimid dynasty. The harem of Sultan Al-Nasir Muhammad expanded to a larger size than any preceding Mamluk sultan, and he left a harem of 1,200 female slaves at his death, 505 of which were qiyan singing girls. He manumitted and married the slave Tughay (d. 1348), who left 1,000 slave girls and 80 eunuchs at her own death.

The harem played an influential part: the emir Arghun Al-alai, regent for sultan Al-Salih Ismail, married the sultan's mother to secure his power. Sultan As-Salih Salih (died 1354) gave his mother great influence: he arranged a royal banquet inside the royal harem, where he served her himself and organized a royal procession, a mawkib sultani, which was a ceremony otherwise customarily only given to sultans. Sultan Abu Bakr manumitted and married two of his slave girls, and the sultan al-Salih Ismail manumitted and married his slave concubine Ittifaq, who were later taken as wife by his brother and successor Al-Kamil Sha'ban, and finally by sultan al-Muzaffar.

During the Burji dynasty (1382–1517) the Mamluk Sultanate were no longer an inherited monarchy, and the Burji mamluk sultans were succeeded by their emirs. However, a certain dynastic continuity existed, in which the Sultans married the widow, concubine or female relative of his predecessor. The Burji Mamluk often married free Muslim women of the Mamluk nobility. However, the Burji harem, as its predecessor, maintained the custom of slave concubinage, with Circassian slave girls being popular as concubines, some of which became favorites and even wives of the Sultan. Sultan Qaitbay (r. 1468–1496) had a favorite Circassian slave concubine, Aṣalbāy, who became the mother of Sultan Al-Nasir Muhammad (r. 1496–1498) and later married Sultan Al-Ashraf Janbalat (r. 1500–1501). Her daughter-in-law, Miṣirbāy (d. 1522), a former Circassian slave concubine, married in succession Sultan Al-Nasir Muhammad (r. 1496–1498), sultan Abu Sa'id Qansuh (r. 1498–1500), and in 1517 the Ottoman Governor Khā'ir Bek.

=== Mughal Empire ===
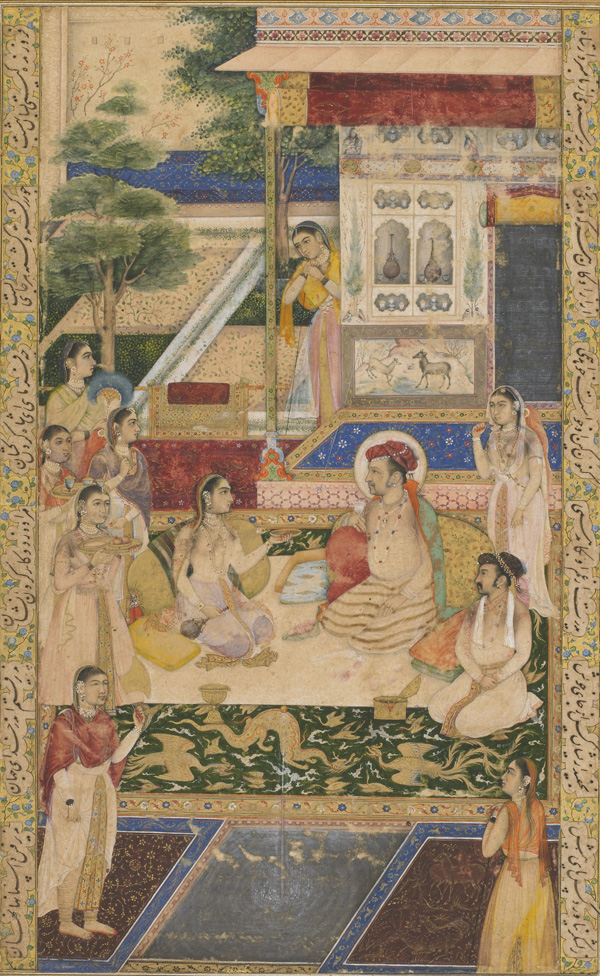
Jahangi seer and Prince Khurram with Nur Jahan, c. 1624. This scene is probably set in the Aram Bagh garden, which the empress Nur Jahan, a great patron of gardens, had re-modeled in 1621.

The king's wives, concubines, dancing girls and slaves were not the only women of the Mughal harem. Many others, including the king's mother, lived in the harem. Aunts, grandmothers, sisters, daughters and other female relatives of the king all lived in the harem; male children also lived in the harem until they grew up. Within the precincts of the harem were markets, bazaars, laundries, kitchens, playgrounds, schools and baths. The harem had a hierarchy, its chief authorities being the wives and female relatives of the emperor and below them, the concubines.

Urdubegis were the class of women assigned to protect the emperor and inhabitants of the zenana. Because the women of the Mughal court lived sequestered under purdah, the administration of their living quarters was run entirely by women. The division of the administrative tasks was dictated largely by the vision of Akbar, who organized his zenana of over 5,000 noble women and servants. The women tasked with the protection of the zenana were commonly of Habshi, Tatar, Turk and Kashmiri origin. Kashmiri women were selected because they did not observe purdah. Many of the women were purchased as slaves and trained for their positions.

Individual women of the Mughal harem are known to have attained political influence. Nur Jahan, chief consort of Jahangir, was the most powerful and influential woman at court during a period when the Mughal Empire was at the peak of its power and glory. More decisive and proactive than her husband, she is considered by historians to have been the real power behind the throne for more than fifteen years. Nur Jahan was granted certain honours and privileges that were never enjoyed by any Mughal empress before or after. Nur Jahan was the only Mughal empress to have coinage struck in her name. She was often present when the Emperor held court, and even held court independently when the Emperor was unwell. She was given charge of his imperial seal, implying that her perusal and consent were necessary before any document or order received legal validity. The Emperor sought her views on most matters before issuing orders. The only other Mughal empress to command such devotion from her husband was Nur Jahan's niece Mumtaz Mahal, for whom Shah Jahan built the Taj Mahal as a mausoleum. However, Mumtaz took no interest in affairs of state and Nur Jahan is therefore unique in the annals of the Mughal Empire for the political influence she wielded.

=== Muhammad Ali dynasty of Egypt ===
The royal harem of the Muhammad Ali dynasty of the Khedivate of Egypt (1805–1914) was modelled after Ottoman example, the khedives being nominally the Egyptian viceroys of the Ottoman sultans.

Muhammad Ali was appointed viceroy of Egypt in 1805, and by Imperial Ottoman example assembled a harem of slave concubines in the Palace Citadel of Cairo which, according to a traditional account, made his legal wife Amina Hanim declare herself to henceforth be his wife in name only, when she joined him in Egypt in 1808 and discovered his sex slaves.

Similar to the Ottoman Imperial harem, the harem of the khedive was modelled on a system of polygyny based on slave concubinage, in which each wife or concubine was limited to having one son. The women harem slaves mostly came from Caucasus via the Circassian slave trade and were referred to as "white".

The khedive's harem was composed of between several hundreds to over a thousand enslaved women, supervised by his mother, the walida pasha, and his four official wives (hanim) and recognized concubines (qadin). However, the majority of the slave women served as domestics to his mother and wives, and could have servant offices such as the bash qalfa, chief servant slave woman of the walida pasha.

The enslaved female servants of the khedivate harem were manumitted and married off with a trousseau in strategic marriages to the male freedmen or slaves (kul or mamluk) who were trained to become officers and civil servants as freedmen, in order to ensure the fidelity of their husband's to the khedive when they began their military or state official career.

A minority of the slave women were selected to become the personal servants (concubines) of the khedive, often selected by his mother: they could become his wives, and would become free as an umm walad (or mustawlada) if they had children with their enslaver.

Muhammad Ali of Egypt reportedly had at least 25 consorts (wives and concubines), and Khedive Ismail fourteen consorts of slave origin, four of whom where his wives.

The Egyptian elite of bureaucrat families, who emulated the khedive, had similar harem customs, and it was noted that it was common for Egyptian upper-class families to have slave women in their harem, which they manumitted to marry off to male protegees.

This system gradually started to change after 1873, when Tewfik Pasha married Emina Ilhamy as his sole consort, making monogamy the fashionable ideal among the elite, after the throne succession had been changed to primogeniture, which favored monogamy. The wedding of Tewfik Pasha and Emina Ilhamy was the first wedding of a prince that were celebrated, since the princes had previously merely taken slave concubines, who they sometimes married afterward.

The end of the Circassian slave trade and the elimination of slave concubinage after the Anglo-Egyptian Slave Trade Convention also contributed to the end of the practice of polygyny in the Egyptian and Ottoman upper classes from the 1870s onward. In the mid-19th century, the Ottoman Tanzimat reforms abolished the custom of training male slaves to become military men and civil servants, and replaced them with free students.

All of this gradually diminished the royal harem, though it, as well as the harem of the elite families, still maintained a smaller number of male eunuchs and slave women until at least World War I. Khedive Abbas II of Egypt bought six "white female slaves" for his harem in 1894, and his mother still maintained sixty slaves as late as 1931. The royal harem was finally dissolved when the royal women escaped seclusion and took on a public role in the 1930s.

=== Ottoman Empire ===
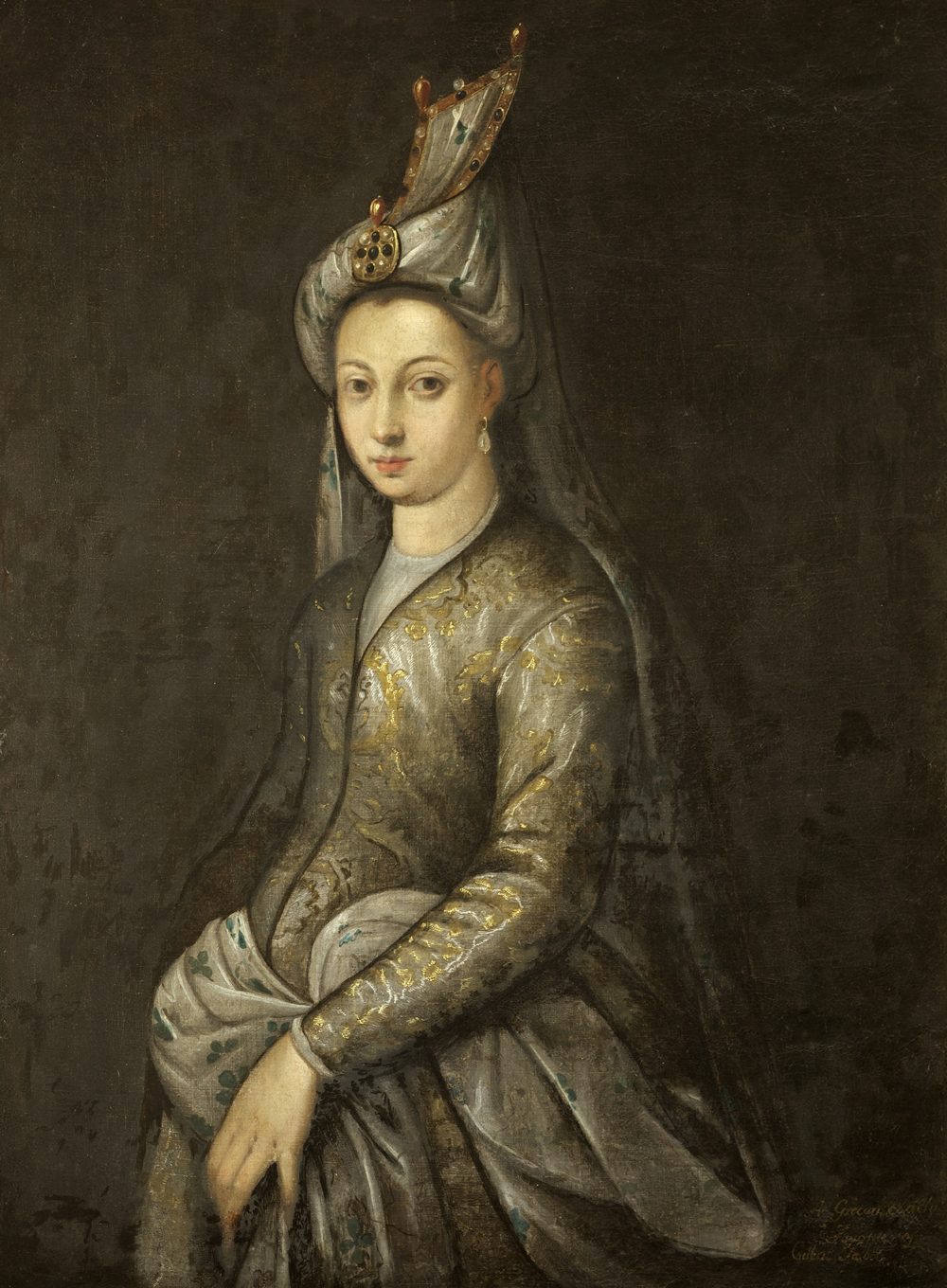
Mihrimah Sultan, daughter of Suleiman the Magnificent

The Imperial Harem of the Ottoman sultan, also called seraglio in the West, was part of Topkapı Palace. It also housed the valide sultan, as well as the sultan's daughters and other female relatives. Eunuchs and enslaved servant girls were also part of the harem. During the later periods, the sons of the sultan lived in the Harem until they were 12 years old. It is becoming more commonly acknowledged today that the purpose of harems during the Ottoman Empire was for the upbringing of the future wives of upper-class and royal men. These women would be educated so that they would able to appear in public as wives. In general, however, the separation of men's and women's quarters was never practiced among the urban poor in large cities such as Constantinople, and by the 1920s and 1930s, it had become a thing of the past in middle and upper-class homes.

The Ottoman sultans normally did not marry in the period circa 1500–1850, but instead procreated with enslaved concubines provided via the Crimean slave trade. Some women of an Ottoman harem, especially wives, mothers and sisters of sultans, played very important political roles in Ottoman history, and during the period of the Sultanate of Women, it was common for foreign visitors and ambassadors to claim that the Empire was, de facto ruled by the women in the Imperial Harem. Hürrem Sultan (wife of Suleiman the Magnificent, mother of Selim II), was one of the most powerful women in Ottoman history and wielded vast political power. The title of Haseki Sultan, was created for her and was used by her successors.

Kösem Sultan was also one of the most powerful women in Ottoman history. Kösem Sultan achieved power and influenced the politics of the Ottoman Empire when she became Haseki Sultan as the favourite consort and later legal wife of Ottoman Sultan Ahmed I (r. 1603–1617) and valide sultan as mother of Murad IV (r. 1623–1640) and Ibrahim (r. 1640–1648), and grandmother of Mehmed IV (r. 1648–1687).

Kösem's son, Sultan Ibrahim the Mad, Ottoman ruler from 1640 to 1648, is said to have drowned 280 concubines of his harem in the Bosphorus. At least one of his concubines, Turhan Sultan, a Rus' girl (from the area around modern Ukraine) who came into the Ottoman Empire as a slave sold by Nogai slavers, survived his reign.

=== Safavid Empire ===
The royal harem played an important role in the history of Safavid Iran. The Safavid harem consisted of: mothers, wives, slave concubines, female relatives; it was staffed with female slaves, and eunuchs who acted as their guards and channels to the rest of the world. Shah Soltan Hoseyn's (r. 1694–1722) court has been estimated include five thousand slaves: male and female, black and white, of which one hundred were black eunuchs.

The monarchs of the Safavid dynasty preferred to procreate through slave concubines, which would neutralize potential ambitions from relatives and other in-laws and protect family patrimony. The slave concubines (and later mothers) of the Shah mainly consisted of enslaved Circassian, Georgian and Armenian women, captured as war booty, bought at the slave market or received as gifts from local potentates. The slave concubines were sometimes forced to convert to Shia Islam upon entering the harem, and referred to as kaniz. In contrast to the common custom in Islamic courts allowing only non-Muslim women to become harem concubines, the Safavid harem also contained Muslim concubines, as some free Persian Muslim daughters were given by their families or taken by the royal household to the harem as concubines.

The enslaved harem women could achieve great influence, but there are also examples of the opposite. Shah Abbas II (r. 1642–1666) burned three of his slave wives alive because they refused to drink with him, and another wife for lying about her menstruation period. Shah Safi (r. 1629–1642) stabbed his wife to death for disobedience.

Slave eunuchs performed various tasks in many levels of the harem as well as in the general court, where they had offices such as in the royal treasury, as the tutors and adoptive fathers of non-castrated slaves selected to be slave soldiers (ghilman). Inside the harem they served as a channel between the secluded harem women and the outside court and world, which gave them a potentially powerful role at court.

In the early Safavid era, young princes were placed in the care of a lala (high-ranking Qizilbash chief who acted as a guardian) and were eventually given charge of important governorates. Although this system had the danger of encouraging regional rebellions against the shah, it gave the princes education and training, which prepared them for dynastic succession. This policy was changed by Abbas the Great (r. 1587–1629), who largely banished the princes to the harem, where their social interactions were limited to the ladies of the harem and eunuchs. This deprived them of administrative and military training as well as experience in dealing with the aristocracy of the realm. This, together with the princes' indulgent upbringing, made them unprepared to carry out royal responsibilities, and often they were uninterested in doing so. The confinement of royal princes to the harem was an important factor contributing to the decline of the Safavid dynasty.

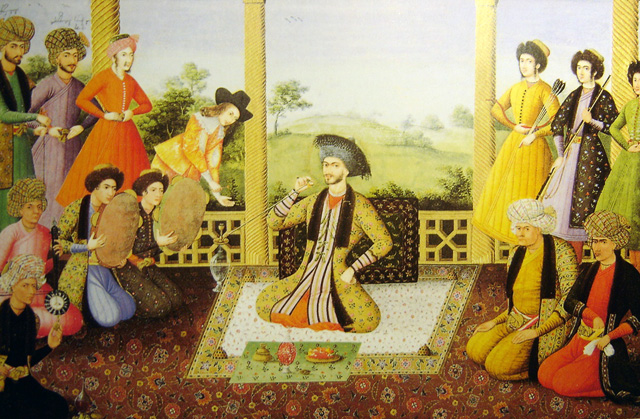
Suleiman I and his courtiers (1670)

The administration of the royal harem constituted an independent branch of the court, staffed mainly by eunuchs. These were initially black eunuchs, but white eunuchs from Georgia also began to be employed from the time of Abbas I.

The mothers of rival princes in league with eunuchs, engaged in palace intrigues in an attempt to place their candidate on the throne. From the middle of the sixteenth century, rivalries between Georgian and Circassian women in the royal harem gave rise to dynastic struggles of an ethnic nature previously unknown at the court. When Shah Abbas II died in 1666, palace eunuchs engineered the succession of Suleiman I and effectively seized control of the state. Suleiman set up a privy council, which included the most important eunuchs in the harem, thereby depriving traditional state institutions of their functions. The eunuchs' influence over military and civil affairs was checked only by their internal rivalries and by the religious movement led by Muhammad Baqir Majlisi. The royal harem reached such proportions under Soltan Hoseyn (1668–1726) that it consumed a large part of state revenues. After the fall of the Safavid dynasty, which occurred soon afterwards, eunuchs were never again able to achieve significant political influence as a class in Iran.

=== Saudi Arabia ===
King Ibn Saud had a traditional Islamic harem, complete with eunuchs, multiple wives, and enslaved concubines who were made umm walad when he acknowledged paternity of their children. While he is known to have had a great number of consorts, the exact amount is disputed. As was customary for royalty, his harem also included house slaves (young girls who acted as servants of the wives and concubines).

As in prior royal Islamic harems, there were women of different nationalities among the wives and concubines. For example, the mother of Prince Tallal was an Armenian, while the mother of Prince Fahd was an Arab of the Sudairi tribe. His legal wives would normally have been free Arab women. Ibn Saud made diplomatic alliances by marrying brides from different Arab tribes. Since he could only have four legal wives at the same time, he regularly divorced his wives in order to marry new ones; this resulted in a constant flow of new wives to the harem, which made it possible for him to form marriage alliances with thirty different tribes. Aside from his wives, he had enslaved concubines. These women were trafficked to Saudi Arabia via a number of different routes, depending on their place of origin. Among his concubines was Baraka Al Yamaniyah, an African woman who gave birth to his son Prince Moqren bin Abdul Aziz.

Ibn Saud informed Harry St John Philby that he had taken the virginity of hundreds of slave girls and then given them away as presents; specifically, he claimed to have deflowered 135 virgin slave girls and to have had sexual intercourse with an additional 100 enslaved women. However, he told Philby, he had decided henceforward to only marry two new wives per year and limit himself to "four concubines, wives in all but name... and four slave-girls, to say nothing of his right to select from the damsels at his disposal". In 1945, Winston Churchill noted that Ibn Saud:

...still lived the existence of a patriarchal king of the Arabian desert, with his forty living sons and the seventy ladies of the harem, and three or four official wives, as prescribed by the Prophet, one vacancy being kept.

Ibn Saud is reported to have been the father of 42 sons and 125 daughters. The children were raised by and named after their mothers, sharing their status in the harem's hierarchy; the sons of umm walad slaves had lower status than the sons of wives.

The sons of Ibn Saud were also given enslaved concubines, many of whom Ibn Saud purchased from the slave market. It was reported that when his sons visited Europe, they assumed European women could similarly be purchased. Prince Sultan bin Abdulaziz had a concubine named Khizaran who became the mother of Prince Bandar bin Sultan Al Saud. Her son later stated that "I was conceived out of wedlock and my mother was a concubine", but that in accordance with Islamic custom he was not considered illegitimate despite the fact that his parents were unmarried, since the child of a Muslim man and his slave is viewed as legitimate if the father acknowledges paternity. His mother had been a house slave before she was given as a concubine to the prince; her son has stated: "My mother was not related to any tribal leader that would provide me with power, nor was she from a royal family."

Having lived in the Asir Province of Saudi Arabia, which nestles across from Africa, Khizaran was darker skinned, a feature she passed on to her son Bandar, who is noticeably darker than his brothers. It has been a common misconception in the U.S. press that the prince's mother was African. Bandar often derives curious enjoyment from knowing the truth of a situation while the media speculates endlessly and wrongly about him, and he has made no attempt to explain the geographical background to his mother's heritage. He confessed, "I coyly let that stand for a long time, because as you know by now, I enjoy knowing something that the whole world is talking about mistakenly and I know that it is not true."

Slavery in Saudi Arabia was abolished in 1962, after which no slaves (and therefore no concubines) could officially or legally be kept in the Saudi royal harem.

=== Seljuk Empire ===
The royal Seljuk harem of the Seljuk Empire is only fragmentarily mentioned, since it was considered a private family affair, and even the names of most women of the Seljuk and the other Anatolian Turkish dynasties are rarely known.

The Seljuk harem and the harems of the other Islamic Turkish dynasties in Anatolia were similar and are believed to have been the role model for the later Ottoman Imperial Harem. The Seljuk harem were referred to as the mukhaddarat-i haram. As was the custom for royal Islamic harems, it included the mother, the four legal wives and the non-Muslim slave-concubines of the sultan, as well as the unmarried sisters, daughters and infant sons of the sultan, although the exact hierarchy of the harem is unconfirmed. The female family members, slave-concubines and children of the sultan was waited upon by a staff of eunuchs and female servants (slaves) referred to as khadam-i haram.

The slaves, as well as the slave-concubines in Muslim Anatolia, were commonly of Christian Greek origin. In the 11th to the 15th century, Anatolia was a religious border zone of warfare between dar al-Islam (the Muslim world) and dar al-Harb (the non-Muslim world), and the Orthodox Christian Greek population of Western Anatolia and the Aegean Islands was, as kafir infidels, consequently considered legitimate targets of enslavement by Muslims. Christian Greeks, as well as Catholic Italian Franks from the Frankokratia, were popular in the slave trade to the Islamic sultanates of Anatolia, and Christian Greek appear to have been the common one among the slave-concubines as well as male and female slaves of the harem staff.

The love poetry of Islamic Anatolia were often directed toward Christian slave-concubines, and Greek women were idealized and highly sought after by Anatolian Muslim men of all classes as concubines and wives. The Byzantine historian Doukas remarked:

The people of this shameless and savage nation, moreover, do the following: if they seize a Greek woman or an Italian woman or a woman of another nation or a captive or a deserter, they embrace her as an Aphrodite or Semele, but a woman of their own nation or of their own tongue they loathe as though she were a bear or a hyena.

The sultans could have four wives, and were known to marry free Muslim women as well as former slave-concubines. A Greek Christian background was the dominant one among the harem slave concubines, and consequently among the wives, of the Anatolian and Seljuk sultans; among them were the unnamed mother of Ghiyath al-Din Kaykhusraw I; Mahpari Khatun, mother of Kaykhusraw II (who was married to a Christian, the Georgian Tamar/Gurji Khatun); and Prodoulia, mother of Izz al-Din Kaykhusraw II.

The Seljuk and Anatolian harems practiced the "one mother–one son" policy, which meant that as soon as a wife or a slave concubine gave birth to a male child, the sultan stopped having sex with her and she became a post-sexual female, since no woman was allowed to give birth to more than one son.

The Christian wives and slave-concubines were free to practice their religion inside of the harem. The children of Christian mothers were often baptised by their mothers; the daughters were allowed to be Christians, but the sons were always brought up as Muslims although their mothers were often allowed to baptise them.

=== Southeast Asian Sultanates ===
The Royal harems in South East Asia include the harems of the Aceh Sultanate on Sumatra, the Mataram Sultanate on Java, the Banten Sultanate on Sumatra, and the Gowa Sultanate of Sulawesi. The conversion of Islam to East Asia made the Islamic law around sexual slavery and other forms of slavery relevant; however, Southeast Asia did not practice Sharia fully but combined it with customary law, which resulted in harems and slavery being partially different there from how they appeared in the rest of the Muslim world.

The royal harems in Southeast Asia where generally relatively small with the exception of the one in Aceh, which reached a considerable size in the 16th and 17th centuries. Eunuchs (sida-sida) were not as common in Southeast Asia as in the rest of the Muslim world, with the exception of the Persian influenced Aceh Sultanate, where there where about 500 eunuchs in 1619–1622; the use of eunuchs ended around 1700. The court of Aceh also used enslaved dancing boys (nias) of the age 8–12, who were also used for sexual slavery, as late as in the 1870s.

In contrast to the rest of the Muslim world, the concubines (gundik) in the harems of Southeast Asia were not always slaves, but could also be free Muslim women, which was illegal in Islamic law. Particularly in Java, the Javanese aristocracy and royalty frequently used free women as concubines. Enslaved concubines were however used alongside free concubines. Girls were kidnapped from their villages or by sea by pirates and slave traders. The Banten Sultanate followed Islamic law more strictly and therefore banned free Muslim concubines and only used enslaved non-Muslim concubines in accordance with Islamic law. Banten acquired their concubines by enslaving girls from "those villages which during the period of Islamisation had refused to embrace the new religion, and had thereupon been declared to be slaves".

Chinese slave girls (mui tsai or anak beli), where sold for use as slave concubines in the harems of Aceh, which still occurred during the Interwar period, when the sales where called adoptions to avoid attention from the colonial Dutch authorities, who banned the slave trade. In contrast to normal Islamic law, the children of a concubine were not given equal status to the children of a wife and could even be deprived of inheritance rights; to be the slave of a concubine was seen as shameful, and many concubines in Aceh used contraception and practiced infanticide for this reason.

Another custom breaking Islamic law was that Muslim slave women could be sold to non-Muslim men, such as Chinese men, which became a big trade in the 18th century. In Jeddah, Kingdom of Hejaz, on the Arabian Peninsula, the Arab king Ali bin Hussein had in his palace twenty young Javanese girls. A Chinese non-Muslim man had a female Indonesian who was of Muslim Arab Hadhrami Sayyid origin in Solo, the Dutch East Indies, in 1913 which was scandalous in the eyes of Ahmad Surkati and his Al-Irshad Al-Islamiya.

The local royal rulers in Southeast Asia continued their custom of slave concubinage also after they had become vassals of Western powers; in Lampung, slave concubines were still kept as late as World War I. It is not known when the custom of slave concubines ended in Southeast Asia, but the custom of harems, polygyny and concubinage was met with criticism from the 1870s among the local indigenous elite after it had been identified by the colonial powers as a reason for the decay of the local indigenous rulers.

=== Timurid Empire ===
The harem of the Timurid dynasty (1370–1507) was divided in to the ranks of wives (khavatin), free concubines (qumayan) and slave concubines (sarariy).

The monarchs of the Timurid dynasty broke Islamic law by having free Muslim women as concubines. In Islamic law, only non-Muslim slaves could become concubines, but the Timurid rulers secured loyalty among high rank local Muslim families by making their daughters concubines in their harem, since the number of wives was limited to four. This break against Islamic law did cause criticism, and was criticized by Babur; but it was still accepted, since the prominent Muslim families concerned acquired advantages through it as it increased the chances of their daughters to become the consort of the monarch.

The Timurid harem is only fragmentary documented, and few women played any influential role, with the exception of Khadija Begi Agha, mother of Muzaffar Husayn Mirza, and Zuhra Begi Agha, mother of Muhammad Shaybani.

=== Tulunid Emirate ===
The Tulunids (868–905) who ruled Egypt on behalf of the Abbasid Caliphate had a harem that included both legal wives, slave concubines and eunuchs, of the Abbasid harem model. The Tulunid harem was organized with legal wives and concubines whose sons were both considered legitimate and eligible to become heirs, in accordance with Islamic law. The harem included a number of jawari, female slave entertainers. The women of the harem were attended to and guarded by slave eunuchs.

The founder Ahmad ibn Tulun (r. 868–884) owned a number of concubines, and appears to have had sons with at least three; he also had legal wives, of which one was the daughter of Yarjukh (d. 872), a Turkish commander of Samarra and early patron of his father (Ahmad ibn Tulun), and mother of al-Abbas, Ibn Tulun's eldest son and designated heir; his next son and heir, Khumarawayh, was the son of a concubine.

Khumarawayh ibn Ahmad ibn Tulun (r. 884– 896) himself, the son of a concubine, reportedly suspected that his jawari-concubines were committing adultery with his eunuchs, and were killed by hs eunuchs in 896. Ibn al-Athir described the event of 896:

Khumarawayh was told that his jawari in his palace in Egypt would have eunuchs as lovers, and enjoyed affairs with them like a husband would. He ordered his deputy to investigate the matter with the jawari. The eunuchs close to him in Damascus feared his reaction if the truth of their situation was revealed, and so decided collectively to kill him.

=== Qajar Iran ===
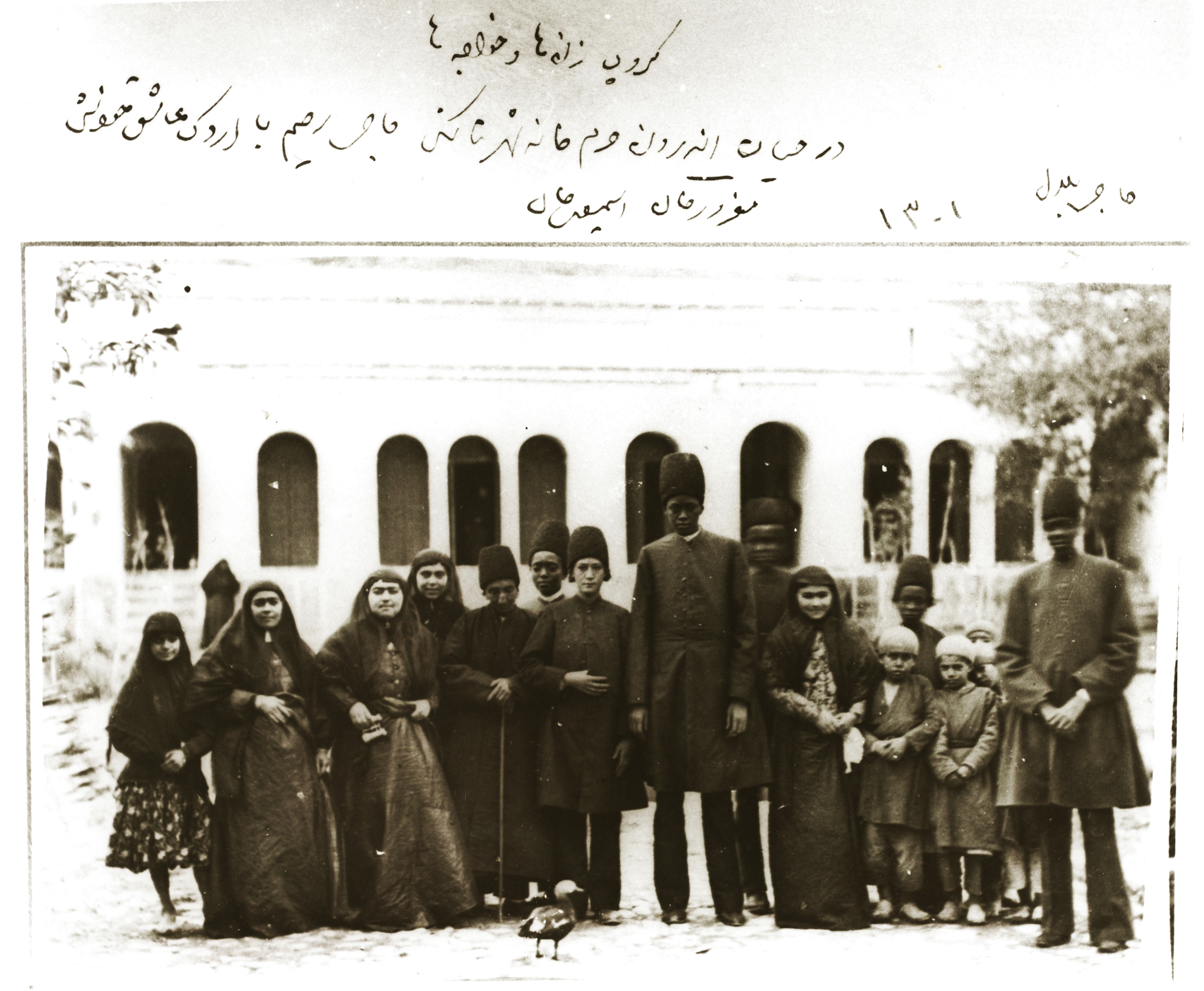
King-wives and eunuchs

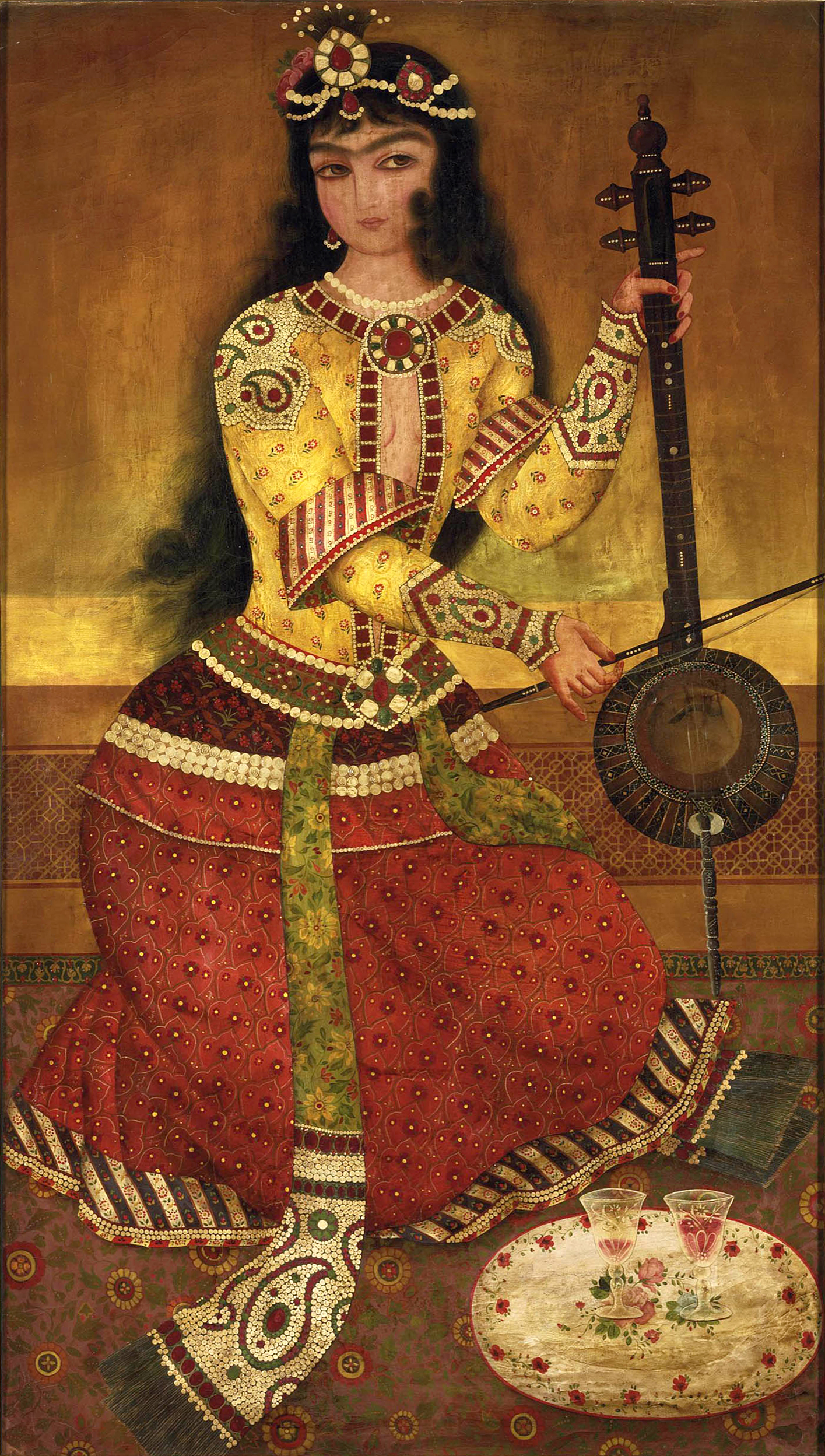
Woman in the harem playing a kamancheh, from a Qajar era painting.

The harem of the monarchs of the Qajar dynasty (1785–1925) consisted of several thousand people. The harem had a precise internal administration, based on the women's rank.

As was customary in Muslim harems, the highest rank of the harem hierarchy was that of the monarchs' mother, who in Qajar Iran had the title Mahd-e ʿOlyā ('Sublime Cradle'). She had many duties and prerogatives, such as safeguarding the harem valuables, particularly the jewels, which she administered with the help of female secretaries.

In contrast to what was common in the Ottoman Empire, where the sultans normally only had slave consorts, the Qajar shahs also had a custom of diplomatic marriages with free Muslim women, daughters of Qajar dignitaries and princes. Another phenomenon of the Qajar harem was that the Shah entered into two different kinds of marriages with his harem women: ṣīḡa (temporary wife), which was often done with concubines, and ʿaqdī (permanent wives); this was a promotion. The wives and slave concubines of Fath-Ali Shah Qajar came from the harems of the vanquished houses of Zand and Afshar; from the Georgian and Armenian campaigns, as well as from slave markets, and were presented as gifts to the shah from the provinces.

Every consort had white and black slave servants (women or eunuchs), whose number varied according to her status. Some wives had their own residence and stables. There were different types of female officials within the harem: some managed the royal coffeehouse inside the harem, a body of female sentinels commanded by women officials "protected the king's nightly rest", and women called ostāds (masters) supervised the group of female dancers and musicians who entertained the harem; they were housed with their servants in a separate compound. Young slave boys below puberty (ḡolām-bačča) were used as servants and playmates in the harem. Eunuchs were mainly African slaves.

The women of the harem were responsible for everything inside the harem quarters, but the harem was guarded from the other parts of the palace (biruni) by the eunuchs, who together with visits from relatives, physicians and tailors served as links to the outside world for the women; the women were not allowed to leave the harem themselves.

The harem women had daily entertainments such as music, dance, theatrical performances and games. They studied the arts, calligraphy and poetry, and entertained themselves and the shah with music, dance and singing, and by reciting verses and telling stories, which the shah enjoyed at bedtime. The harem had its own theatre where passion plays (taʿzia) were performed, and one of the shah's wives was the custodian of all the paraphernalia and props. Toward the end of the Qajar dynasty, foreign tutors were allowed into the harem.

Inside the harem, women performed religious functions such as rawża-ḵᵛāni (the commemoration of the martyrdom of Imam Ḥosayn at Karbalā); they preached from the pulpit on the day of ʿĀšurā (q.v., the 10th of Moḥarram) and directed the ritual of sina-zadan (beating of the chest).

The Qajar harem also had the political influence and intrigues common in royal harems. Until a regulated succession to the throne was established by Naser al-Din Shah Qajar (r. 1848–1896), the harem was a place of intense struggle by mothers of potential heirs to have their own sons elected to the throne, as well as having material benefits for themselves, higher ranks for members of their own families, or precedence for their own children. Naser al-Din Shah's mother, Malek Jahan Khanom, wielded a major influence that secured his own succession and the dismissal and subsequent assassination in of Prime Minister Amir Kabir. Naser al-Din Shah's favorite wife, Anis al-Dawla, brought about the dismissal of the Premier Mirza Hosein Khan Sepahsalar in 1873. Both Persian policymakers as well as foreign diplomats, therefore, sought support within the royal harem.

=== Uzbekistan ===
In the Islamic Khanates of Central Asia, harems existed until the introduction of Communism by the Soviets after the Russian Revolution.

==== Khiva ====
The royal harem of the Arabshahid dynasty (Yadigarid Shibanid dynasty) and the Qungrad dynasty of the Khanate of Khiva (1511–1920) in Central Asia (Uzbekistan) was composed of both legal wives and slave concubines. The khan had four legal wives, who were obliged to be free Muslim women. Aside from his legal wives, enslaved women were acquired from slave markets and were obliged to be non-Muslims since free Muslim women could not be slaves. The enslaved girls were initially given as servants to the khan's mother. She provided them with an education to make them suitable for concubinage, after which some of them were selected to be the concubines to the khan.

Only the khan's legal wives were allowed to give birth to his children, and the slave concubines who conceived were given forced abortions. The women could be sold off if they did not please the khan, or given in marriage to his favored subjects. The son of the khan was not allowed to inherit his father's concubine, so when a khan died, his concubines were sold at the slave market. Men were normally not allowed to visit the harem, but Jewish tradeswomen were allowed in to sell their wares, such as clothes, to the harem inhabitants.

==== Bukhara ====
The royal harem of the Manghud or Manghit dynasty ruler of the Emirate of Bukhara (1785–1920) in Central Asia (Uzbekistan) was similar to that of the Khanate of Khiva. The last Emir of Bukhara was reported to have a harem with 100 women (provided via the Bukhara slave trade), but also a separate "harem" of "nectarine-complexioned dancing boys". The harem was abolished when the Soviets conquered the area and the khan Sayyid Mir Muhammad Alim Khan was forced to flee; he reportedly left the harem women behind, but did take some of his dancing boys with him.

=== Zanzibar and Oman ===
The model of the royal harem of Zanzibar were similar to most royal harems at the time. Enslaved eunuchs were employed to guard and manage the affairs of the harem, while female slave maids were employed to see to the needs of the slave concubines, the wives and the female relatives.

The memoirs of Princess Emily Ruete provides valuable insight and description of the royal harem. Sultan Seyyid Said had three legal wives, but despite all his marriages being childless, he nevertheless had 36 children, who must thus have been born to slave concubines. The concubines were referred to as sarari or suria, and could be of several different ethnicities, often Ethiopian or Circassian. Ethiopian, Indian or Circassian (white) women were much more expensive than the majority of African women sold in the slave market in Zanzibar, and white women in particular were so expensive that they were in practice almost reserved for the royal harem. White slave women were called jariyeh bayza and imported to Oman and Zanzibar via Persia (Iran) and had the reputation that such concubines "soon renders the house of a moderately rich man unendurable". The white slave women were generally referred to as "Circassian", but this was a general term and did not specifically refer to Circassian ethnicity as such but could refer to any white women, such as Georgian or Bulgarian. Emily Ruete referred to all white women in the royal harem as "Circassian" as a general term, one of whom was her own mother Jilfidan, who had arrived via the Circassian slave trade to become a concubine at the royal harem as a child. When the sultan Said bin Sultan died in 1856, he had 75 enslaved sararai concubines in his harem.

Emily Ruete described the multi-ethnic Royal harem in her memoirs:

Arabic was the only language really sanctioned in my father's presence. But as soon as he turned his back, a truly Babylonian confusion of tongues commenced, and Arabian, Persian, Turkish, Circassian, Swahely, Nubian, and Abyssinian were spoken and mixed up together, not to mention the various dialects of these tongues. [...] Both at Bet il Mtoni and at Bet il Sahel the meals were cooked in the Arab as well as in the Persian and Turkish manner. People of all races lived in these two houses — the races of various beauty. The slaves were dressed in Swaihily style, but we were permitted to appear in Arab fashion alone. Any newly-arrived Circassian or Abyssinian woman had to exchange her ample robes and fantastic attire within three days for the Arab costume provided for her. [...] On the seventh day after the birth of a child my father used to pay a visit to the infant and its mother to present some article of jewellery to the baby. In the same way a new Surie received at once the necessary jewels, and had her servants assigned to her by the chief eunuch.

=== Modern era ===
The practice of female seclusion witnessed a sharp decline in the early 20th century as a result of education and increased economic opportunity for women, as well as Western influences, but it is still practiced in some parts of the world, such as rural Afghanistan and conservative states of the Persian Gulf region.

The big royal harems in the Muslim world begun to dissolve in the late 19th and early 20th century, often due to either abolition or modernisation of the Muslim monarchies, where the royal women where given a public role and no longer lived in seclusion. The Ottoman Imperial Harem, the harem of the Muhammad Ali dynasty of Egypt, as well as the Qajar harem of Iran were all dissolved in the early 20th century. In other cases, the custom lasted longer.

Chattel slavery, and thus the existence of secluded harem concubines, lasted longer in some Islamic states. The report to Advisory Committee of Experts on Slavery (ACE) about Hadhramaut in Yemen in the 1930s described the existence of Chinese girls (Mui tsai) trafficked from Singapore for enslavement as concubines, and the King and Imam of Yemen, Ahmad bin Yahya (r. 1948–1962), were reported to have had a harem of 100 slave women. Sultan Said bin Taimur of Oman (r. 1932–1970) reportedly owned around 500 slaves, an estimated 150 of whom were women, who were kept at his palace at Salalah.

In the 20th century, women and girls for the harem market in the Arabian Peninsula were kidnapped not only from Africa and Baluchistan, but also from the Trucial States, the Nusayriyah Mountains in Syria, and the Aden Protectorate, and 1943, it was reported that Baluchi girls were shipped via Oman to Mecca, where they were popular as concubines since Caucasian girls were no longer available, and were sold for between $350 ($6,512 in 2025) and $450 ($8,373 in 2025).

Harem concubines existed in Saudi Arabia until the very end of the abolition of slavery in Saudi Arabia in 1962. In August 1962, the king's son Prince Talal stated that he had decided to free his 32 slaves and fifty slave concubines. After the abolition of slavery in Saudi Arabia in 1962, the Anti-Slavery International and the Friends World Committee expressed their appreciation over the emancipation edict of 1962, but did ask if any countries would be helped to find their own nationals in Saudi harems who might want to return home; this was a very sensitive issue, since there was an awareness that women were enslaved as concubines (sex slaves) in the seclusion of the harems, and that there were no information as to whether the abolition of slavery had affected them.

Since the early 1980s, a rise in conservative Islamic currents has led to a greater emphasis on traditional notions of modesty and gender segregation, with some radical preachers in Saudi Arabia calling for a return to the seclusion of women and an end of female employment. Many working women in conservative societies have adopted hijab as a way of coping with a social environment where men are uncomfortable interacting with women in the public space. Some religious women have tried to emulate seclusion practices abandoned by their grandmothers' generation in an effort to affirm traditional religious values in the face of pervasive Westernisation.

== Eunuchs and slavery ==
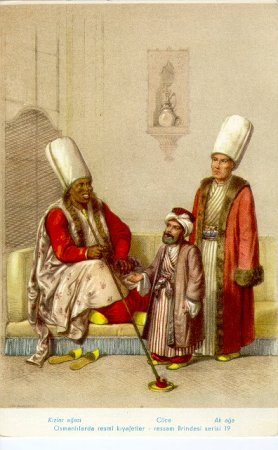
19th-century depiction of the Chief Black Eunuch (left), a court dwarf (middle) and the Chief White Eunuch (right)

Eunuchs were probably introduced into Islamic civilizations (despite castration being Islamically forbidden) through the influence of Persian and Byzantine imperial courts.

The custom of using eunuchs as servants for women inside the Islamic harems had a preceding example in the life of Muhammad himself, who used the eunuch Mabur as a servant in the house of his own slave concubine Maria al-Qibtiyya; both of them slaves from Egypt. Eunuchs were for a long time used in relatively small numbers, exclusively inside harems, but the use of eunuchs expanded significantly when eunuchs started being used also for other offices within service and administration outside of the harem, a use which expanded gradually during the Umayyad Caliphate and had its breakthrough during the Abbasid Caliphate. During the Abbasid period, eunuchs became a permanent institution inside the Islamic harems after the model of the Abbasid harem, such as in the Fatimid harem, Safavid harem and the Qajar harem.

The Ottomans employed eunuchs as guardians of the harem. Istanbul's Topkapı Palace housed several hundred eunuchs in the late-sixteenth century. The head eunuch who guarded the entrance of the harem was known as kızlar ağası. Eunuchs were either Nilotic slaves captured in the Nile vicinity and transported through ports in Upper Egypt, the Sudan and Abyssinia, or European slaves such as Slavs and Franks.

According to the Encyclopedia of Islam, castration was prohibited in Islamic law "by a sort of tacit consensus" and eunuchs were acquired from Christian and Jewish traders. Al-Muqaddasi identifies a town in Spain where the operation was performed by Jews and the survivors were then sent overseas. Encyclopaedia Judaica states that Talmudic law counts castration among mutilations that entitle a slave to immediate release; thus the ability of Jewish slave traders to supply eunuchs to harems depended on whether they could acquire castrated males.

The dark eunuch was held as the embodiment of the sensual tyranny that held sway in the fantasized Ottoman palace, for he had been "clipped" or "completely sheared" to make of him the "ultimate slave" for the supreme ruler. In the Ottoman court, white eunuchs, who were mostly brought from castration centers in Christian Europe and Circassia, were responsible for much of the palace administration, while black eunuchs, who had undergone a double-castration, were the only male slaves employed in the royal harem.

The chief black eunuch, or the Kizlar Agha, came to acquire a great deal of power within the Ottoman Empire. He not only managed every aspect of the harem women's lives but was also responsible for the education and social etiquette of the young women and young princes in the harem. He arranged all the ceremonial events within the harem, including weddings and circumcision parties, and even notified women of death sentences when "accused of crimes or implicated in intrigues of jealousy and corruption".

Nineteenth-century travelers' accounts tell of being served by black eunuch slaves. The trade was suppressed in the Ottoman Empire beginning in the mid-19th century, and slavery was legally abolished in 1887 or 1888. Late 19th-century slaves in Palestine included enslaved Africans and the sold daughters of poor Palestinian peasants. Circassians and Abazins from North of the Black Sea may also have been involved in the Ottoman slave trade.

== Non-Islamic equivalents ==
=== African royal polygamy ===
In Africa south of the Sahara, many non-Muslim chieftains have traditionally had harems.

The Zulu King Goodwill Zwelithini had six wives, for example, and members of the Nigerian chieftaincy system have historically had as many as three hundred of them. Usually, African royal polygamy does not expect wives to be secluded from men or to be prevented from moving outside the harem. Where this is not the case, and the royal wives do live in the harems in isolation, they tend to have a ritual significance in their kingdoms' traditions.

The wives of the Oba of Benin City, a Nigerian kingdom, lived alone in the women's quarters of the Royal Palace. They were allowed to receive only female visitors in the harem, and they themselves normally did not leave it and thus were rarely seen in public. Their seclusion was tied to the religion of Benin City, which held them to be sacred as wives of the Oba.

=== Aztec Empire ===
In Mesoamerica, Aztec ruler Montezuma II, who met Hernán Cortés, kept 4,000 concubines; every member of the Aztec nobility was supposed to have had as many consorts as he could afford.

=== Cambodia ===
There is no support for a harem in Buddhist writings. Nevertheless, harems have been common for Buddhist royal rulers. Normally, the royal Buddhist harems of South East Asia were not as strict as Muslim harems, allowing women some limited freedom outside the harem, but the royal harem of Cambodia was particularly severe, and secluded women for fear they would be unfaithful.

The king of Cambodia had a royal harem consisting of hundreds of women. In a custom common for royal rulers in South East Asia, girls were sent to the king's harem by powerful local families all over the country, as tributes and living acknowledgements of their submission, and the king's right to rule. Those sent became court ladies and were given a number of different tasks. After every coronation, the new king and his main wife-queen would assign different ranks and tasks to the palace women: after the queen came the four wives called preah moneang or preah snang rank, then the preah neang wives, the neak moneang wives, and the neak neang wives. Other palace women became servants, singers or dancers. The harem women could only be seen in public on a few ceremonial occasions; otherwise they were not allowed contact with the outside world and communicated with it through go-betweens in the form of old female palace women servants called ak yeay chastum.

When Cambodia became a French colony, the French colonial officials viewed the abolition of the royal harem and an emancipation of harem women as a part of modernization, as well as a way of cutting the costs of the royal court. After the death of king Norodom in April 1904, the French officials took control of the royal finances, reviewed the allowances of each person in the royal palace, and reduced the number of women that the king could support, in effect, dissolving the harem. King Sisowath (r. 1904–1927) did keep some of the no kang chao (concubines) he had prior to his accession, but no more were added, and the custom of giving daughters as tribute to the royal harem had waned by 1913; after this, the palace women, at least officially, were servants; they also staffed the royal ballet corps.

=== India ===
The harem likely existed in Hindu India before the Islamic conquest; it is mentioned in the ancient stories of the Buddha. However, it appears to have become more common and strict after the Islamic conquests.

After the Islamic conquest of India and the loss of Hindu rulership, gender segregation and seclusion of women practiced by the Muslim conquerors was adopted by Hindus in India, where it became known as purdah. The whole society became more gender segregated after the Muslim conquests. In Bengal, for example, where men and women had previously worked together reaping, men started to do the reaping alone and women were relegated to the more domestic task of husking. Male Hindu rulers commonly had harems as well as Muslim rulers in India from the Middle Ages until the 20th century. One of the reasons why upper-class Hindu men started to seclude women in harems after the Muslim conquest was due to the practice of the Muslim conquerors putting the wives of defeated Hindus into their harems. Disruption of the Hindu social system followed from the mixing of Hindus and Muslims. The seclusion of Hindu women was thus a way to preserve the caste system.

=== Imperial China ===
Harem is also the usual English translation of the Chinese language term hougong (also, hou-kung; Chinese: 後宮; lit. 'the palace(s) behind'), in reference to the Imperial Chinese Harem. Hougong refers to the large palaces for the Chinese emperor's consorts, concubines, female attendants and eunuchs.

The women who lived in an emperor's hougong sometimes numbered in the thousands.

=== Muscovite Terem ===
In Muscovite Russia the area of aristocratic houses where women were secluded was known as terem (Russian: терем). However, aristocratic Muscovite women were not entirely secluded from mixing with men; it was a common custom for the lady of the house to greet a male guest with a welcoming drink ritual when he arrived. She was also waited upon by male as well as female staff upon retiring to her chamber.

== Western representations ==
A distinct, imaginary vision of the harem emerged in the West starting from the 17th century when Europeans became aware of Muslim harems housing numerous women. In contrast to the medieval European views that conceived Muslim women as victimized but powerful through their charms and deceit, during the era of European colonialism, the "imaginary harem" came to represent what Orientalist scholars saw as an abased and subjugated status of women in the Islamic civilization. These notions served to cast the West as culturally superior and justify colonial enterprises. Under the influence of One Thousand and One Nights, the harem was often conceived as a personal brothel, where numerous women lounged in suggestive poses, directing their strong but oppressed sexuality toward a single man in a form of "competitive lust".

A centuries-old theme in Western culture is the depiction of European women being forcibly taken into Oriental harems. A prominent example is the Mozart opera Die Entführung aus dem Serail ('The Abduction from the Seraglio'), in which the hero Belmonte attempts to rescue his beloved Konstanze from the harem of the Pasha Selim.

In Voltaire's Candide, an old woman relates her experiences of being sold into harems across the Ottoman Empire.

Much of Giuseppe Verdi's opera Il corsaro takes place in the harem of the Pasha Seid, where Gulnara, the Pasha's favorite, chafes in captivity, longing for freedom and true love. She eventually falls in love with the dashing corsair Corrado and kills the Pasha to escape with him—only to discover that he loves another woman.

The Lustful Turk is a British novel, published in 1828, about a Western woman who is forced into sexual slavery in the harem of the Dey of Algiers. Similar themes were expressed in A Night in a Moorish Harem, an erotic novel of 1896, where a shipwrecked Western sailor is invited into a harem and engages in "illicit sex" with nine concubines.

The 1919 novel The Sheik, by E. M. Hull, and the 1921 film of the same name are probably the most famous examples from the "desert romance" genre that flourished after the conclusion of the First World War, involving relationships between Western women and Arab sheiks. They have received strong criticisms for the central plot elements: the notion that rape leads to love by forced seduction, or that for women, sexual submission is a necessary and natural condition and that rape is excused by marriage. Historians have also criticized the orientalist portrayal of the Arabs in the novel and the film.

Angelique and the Sultan, part of the Angélique historical novel series by Anne and Serge Golon, later made into a film, has the theme of a 17th-century French noblewoman captured by pirates and taken into the harem of the King of Morocco, where she stabs the king with his own dagger when he tries to have sex with her and stages a daring escape.

The Russian writer Leonid Solovyov adapted the Middle Eastern and Central Asian folktales of Nasreddin in his book Возмутитель спокойствия (Vozmutitel' spokoystviya, translated both as The Beggar in the Harem: Impudent Adventures in Old Bukhara and as The Tale of Hodja Nasreddin: Disturber of the Peace) about hero Nasreddin's beloved being taken into the harem of the Emir of Bukhara and his efforts to rescue her (a theme completely absent from the original folktales).

A Study in Scarlet, the first of Arthur Conan Doyle's Sherlock Holmes mysteries, applies many of the above conventions to the Western phenomenon of Mormon polygamous marriage. In the wild days of the early Mormon settlement of Utah, the protagonist's beloved is kidnapped and placed against her will in the harem of a Mormon elder, where she dies. Having failed to rescue her, the protagonist vows deadly revenge on the kidnappers—the background of the mystery solved by Holmes.

In H. G. Wells's The War in the Air, civilization breaks down due to global war. With the world reverting to barbarism, a strongman takes over a town and starts forcing young women into a harem that he is building up. The protagonist must fight and kill him to save his girlfriend from being included.

In the tales of his galactic secret agent Dominic Flandry, science fiction writer Poul Anderson includes an episode where one of Flandry's love interests is forced into the harem of a corrupt planetary governor. The futuristic harem follows the established literary depictions, except that traditional eunuchs are replaced by extraterrestrials.

=== Image gallery ===
Many Western artists have depicted their imaginary conceptions of the harem.

Depictions of Harems

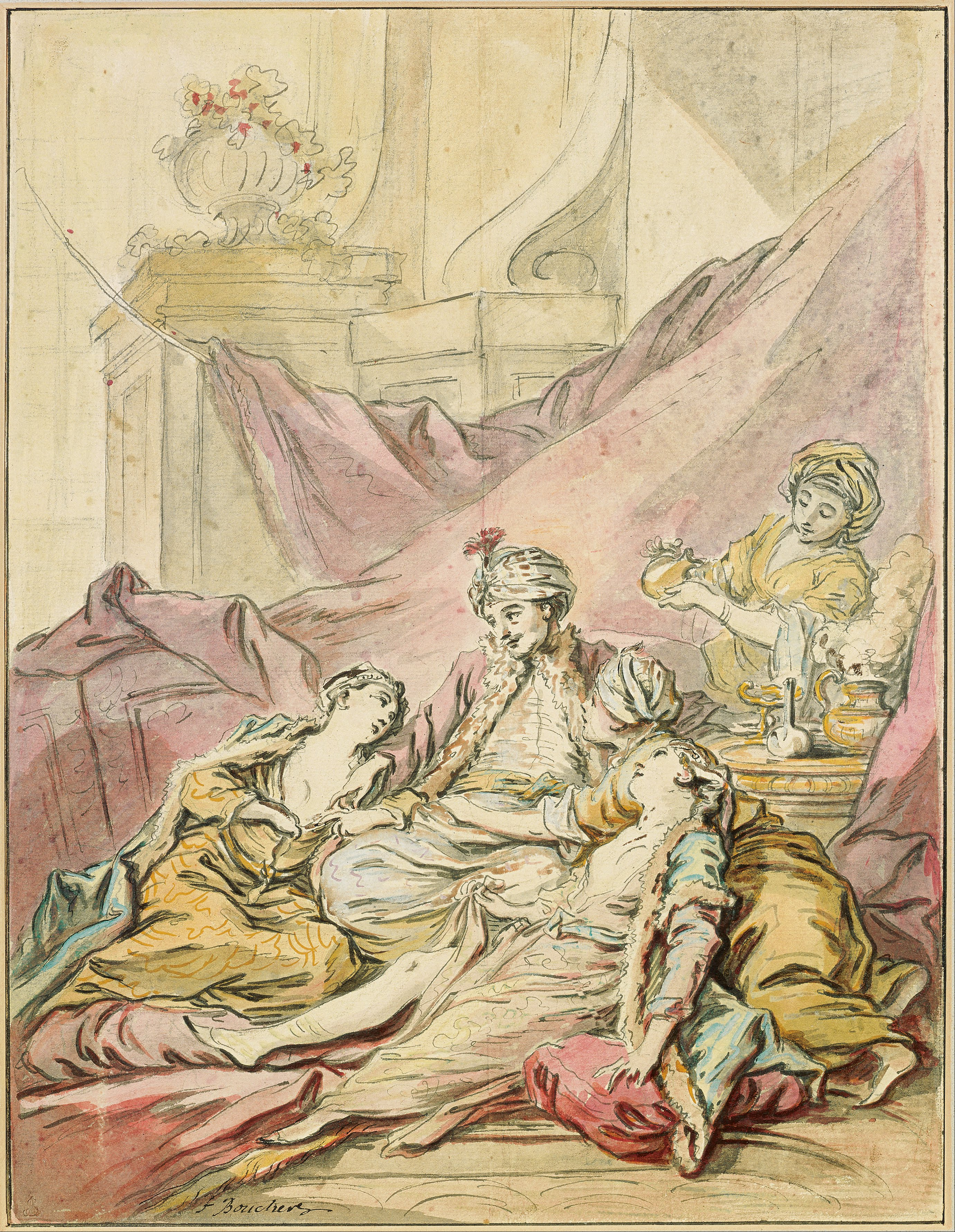
The Pasha in His Harem by Francois Boucher c. 1735–1739

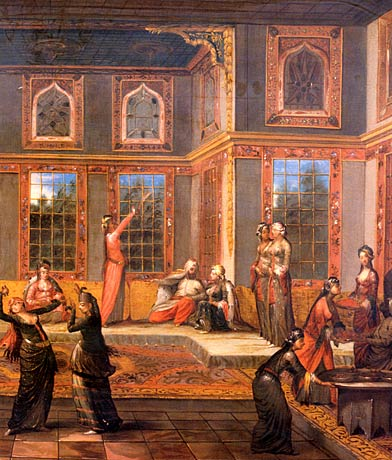
Scene from the Harem, Jean-Baptiste van Mour

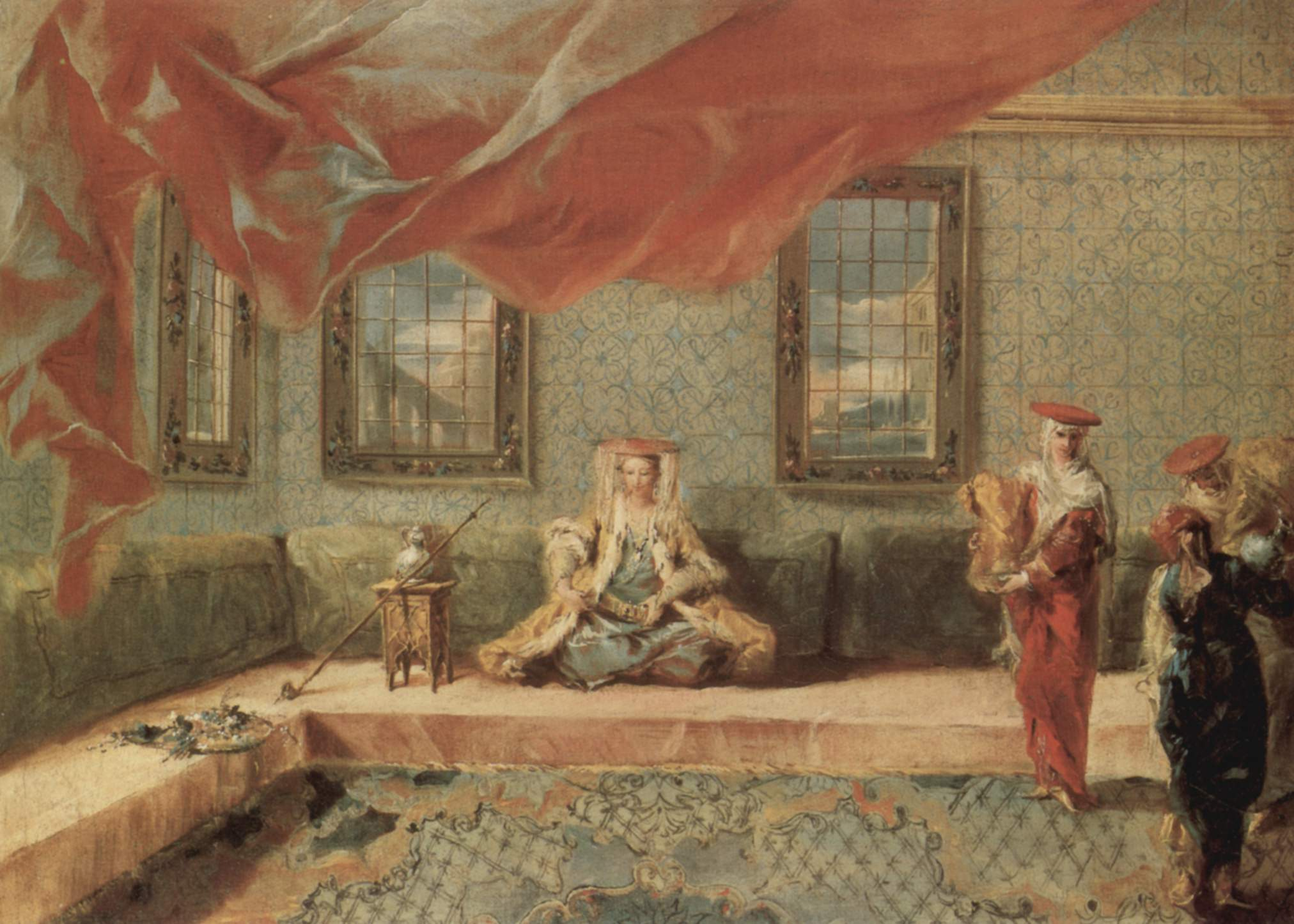
Scene in a Harem, by Francesco Guardi

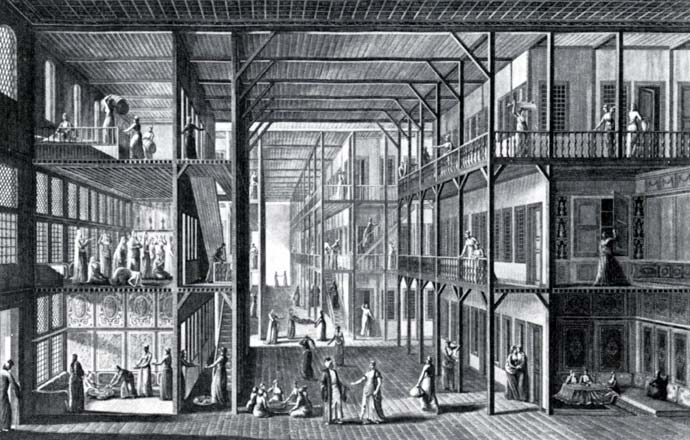
The Dormitory of the Concubines, by Ignace Melling, 1811.

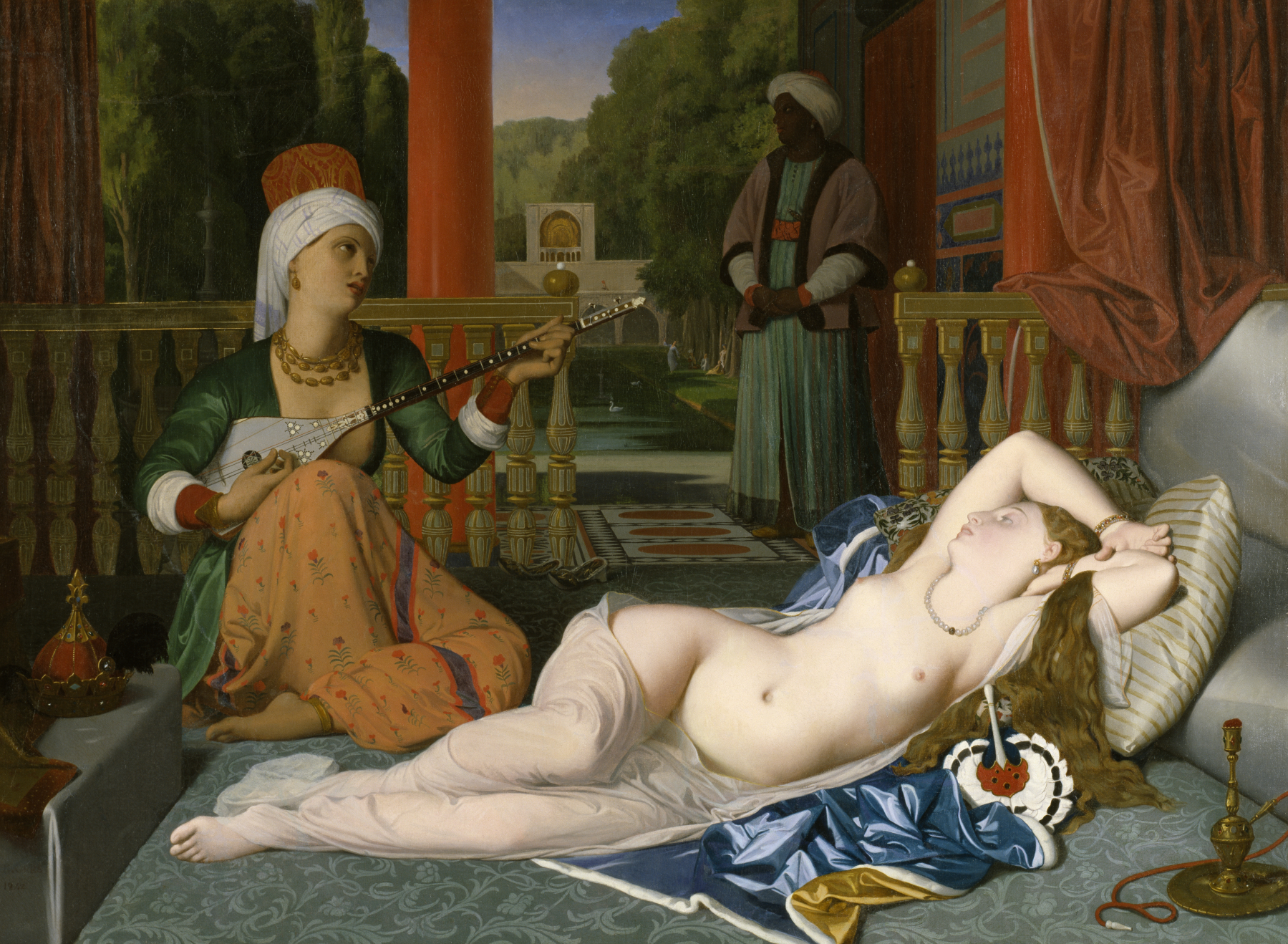
Harem scene, Odalisque with Slave, by Dominique Ingres

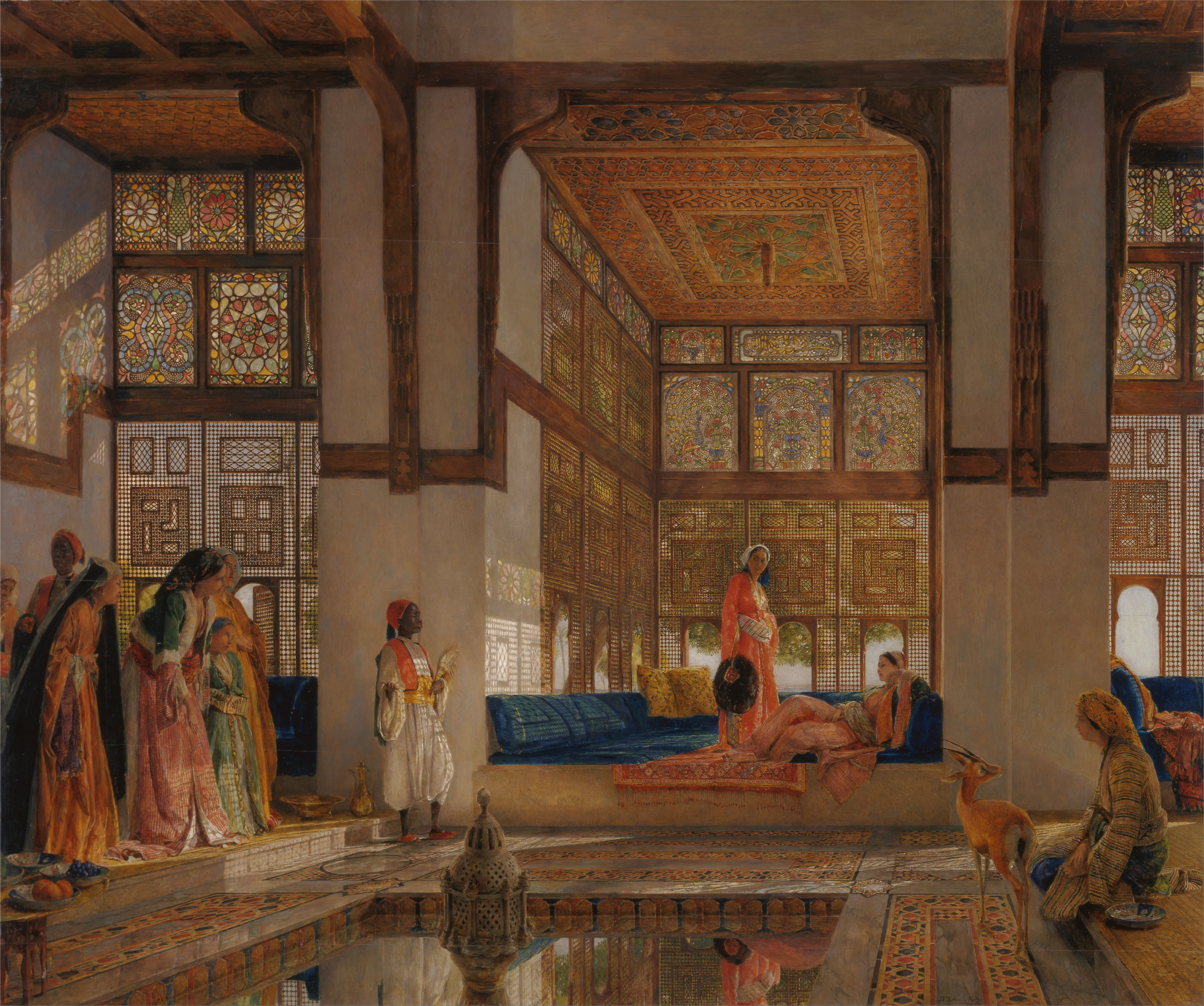
The Reception, John Frederick Lewis, 1805–1875

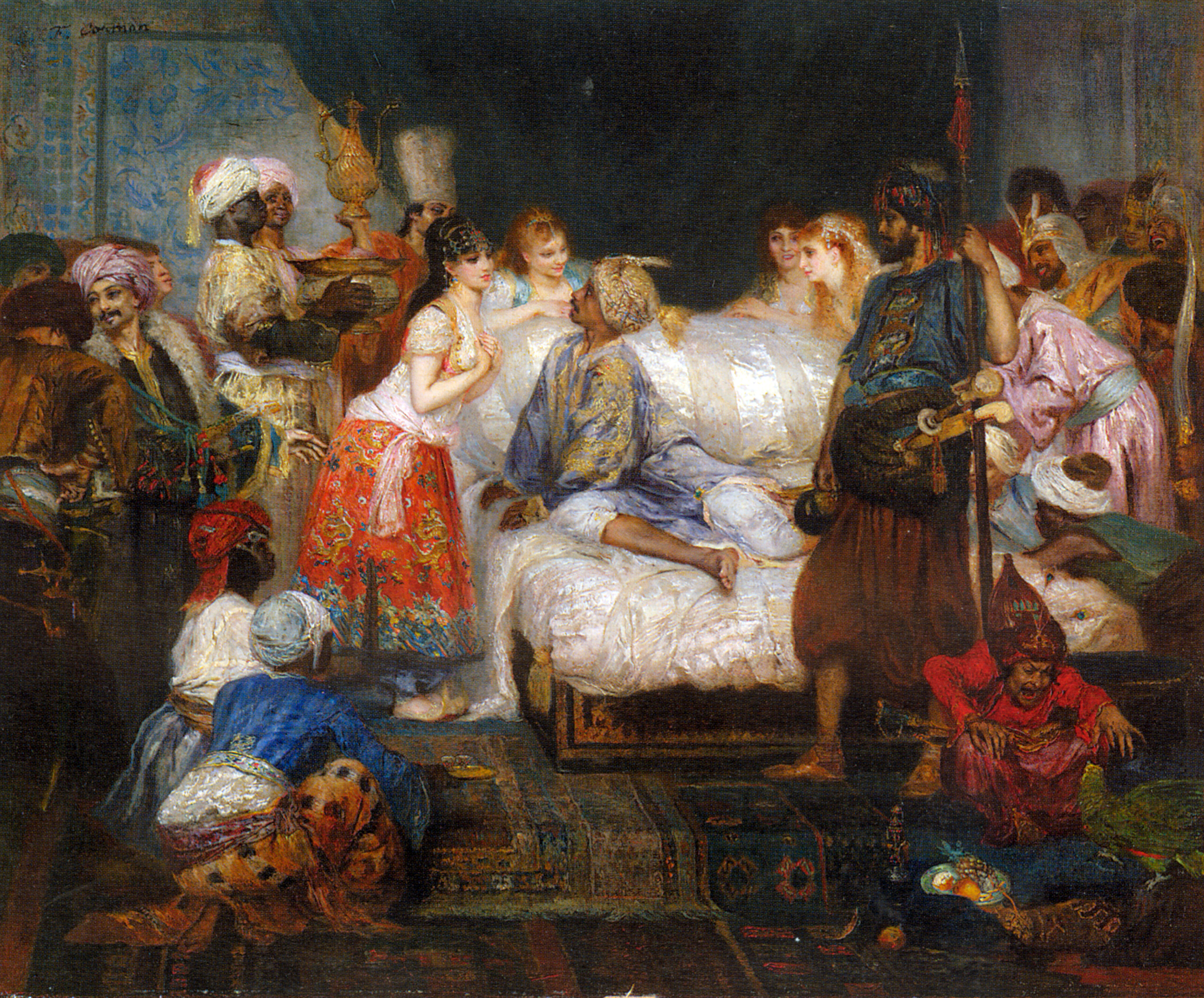
Scene from the Harem by Fernand Cormon, c. 1877

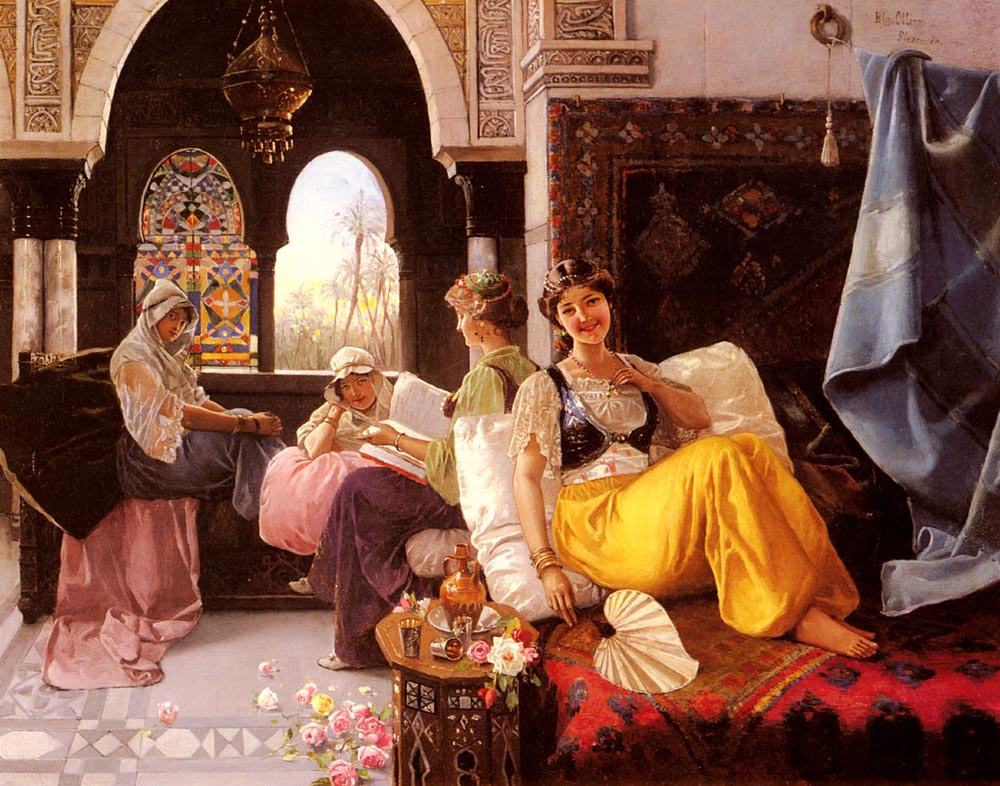
Harem Scene, Quintana Olleras, 1851–1919

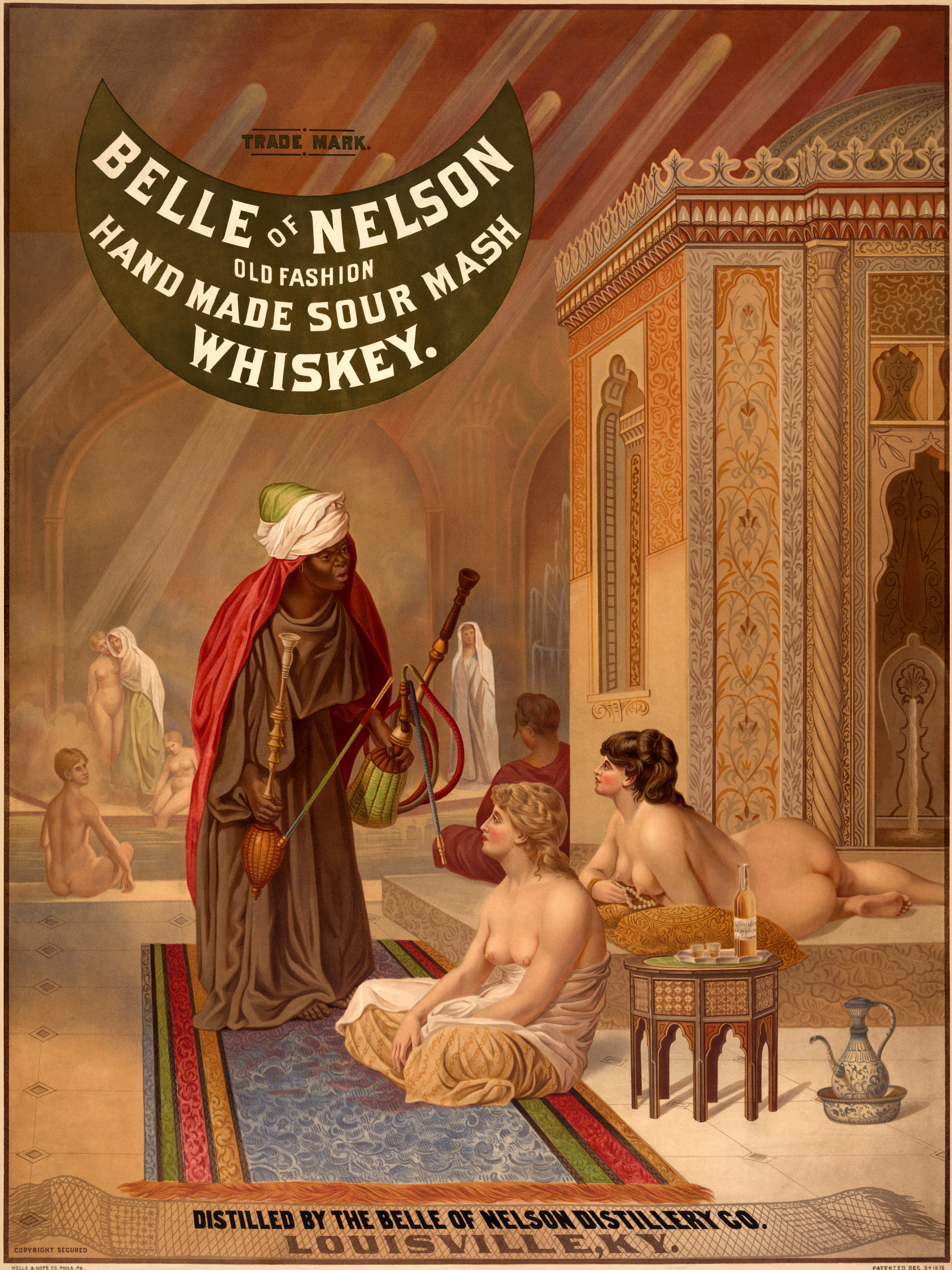
Belle of Nelson, whiskey poster (1878), based on a harem scene by Jean-Léon Gérôme.

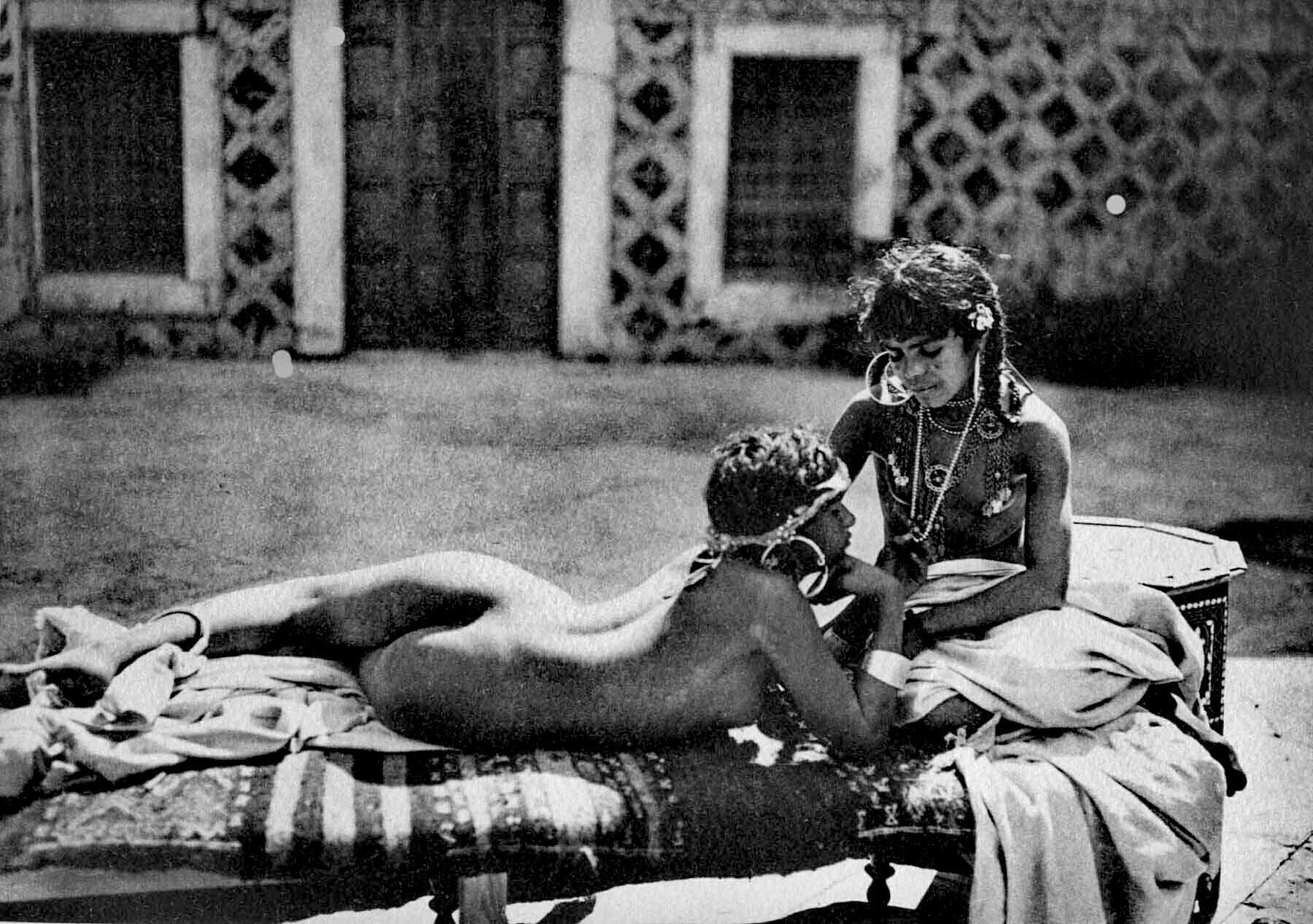
In the harem, Lehnert & Landrock postcard, 1900s–1910s

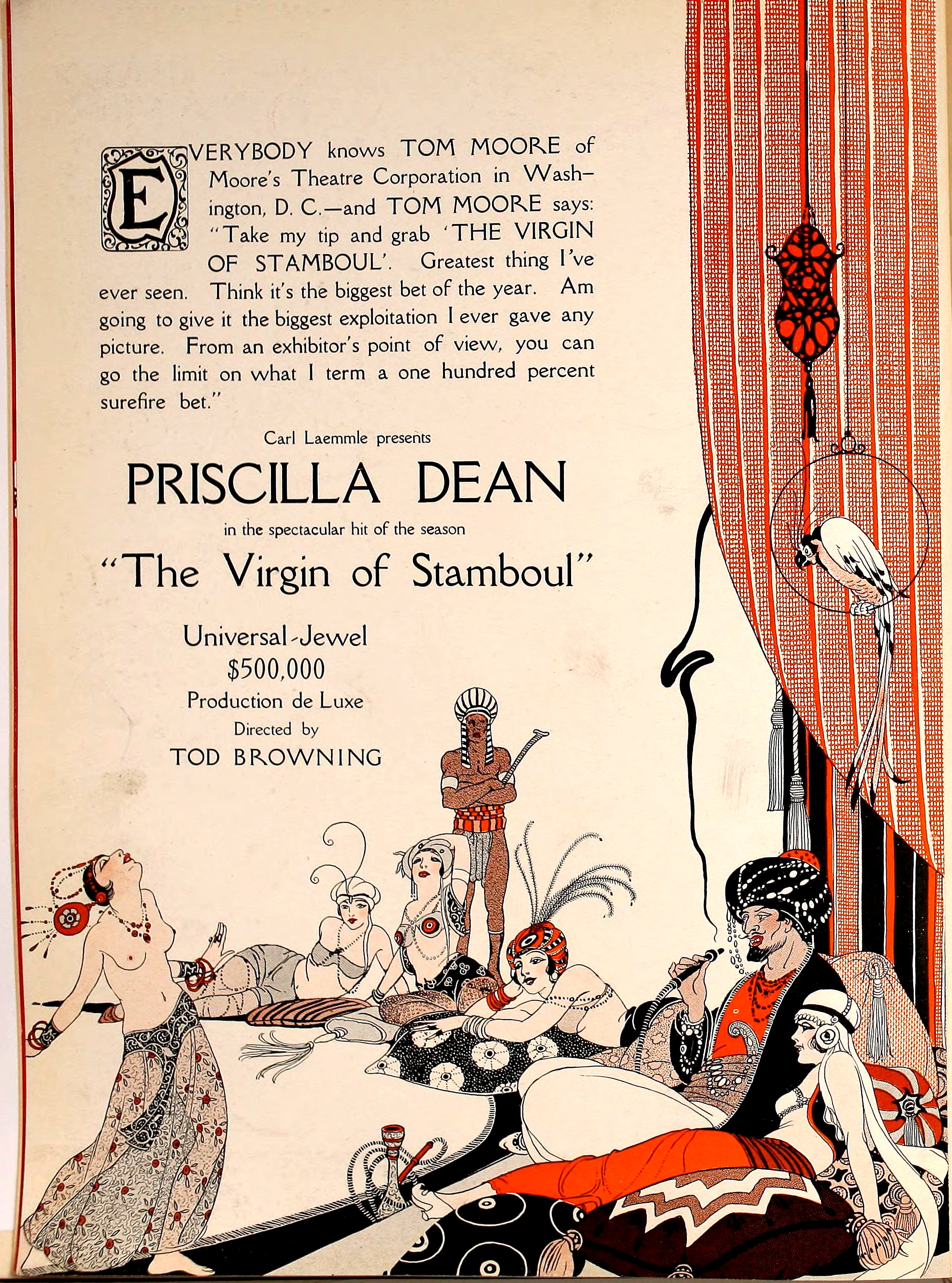
The Virgin of Stamboul, 1920 film poster

== Modern day harems ==
Prince Jefri Bolkiah of Brunei is alleged to have kept a harem of up to 25 women for several years, which included the writer Jillian Lauren, who published Some Girls: My Life in a Harem about her experiences.

Saudi arms dealer Adnan Khashoggi maintained a harem with at least twelve women who were described as his "pleasure wives". One of them was Jill Dodd, a former model and fashion designer, whom he met in 1980. Dodd wrote a memoir named The Currency of Love about their relationship.

== See also ==
=== People ===
- Concubine
- Eunuch
- Odalisque
- Pilegesh

=== Places ===
- Arcadia (utopia)
- Gynaeceum
- Hammam ("Turkish" bath)
- Ōoku
- Seraglio
- Zenana

=== Other ===
- Culture of the Ottoman Empire
- Harem (genre)
- Hypergamy
- Imperial Chinese harem system
- Ottoman Imperial Harem
- Islamic views on concubinage
- Kippumjo
- Mughal Harem
- History of concubinage in the Muslim world
- Women-only space

== Bibliography ==
=== Sources ===
- ʿĀżod-al-Dawla, Solṭān-Aḥmad Mirzā (1997) [1376 Š.]. ʿAbd-al-Ḥosayn Navāʾi (ed.). Tāriḵ-e ʿażodi. Tehran.
- Ahmed, Leila (1992). Women and Gender in Islam. New Haven: Yale University Press.
- Ansary, Tamim (2009). Destiny disrupted: a history of the world through Islamic eyes. New York: PublicAffairs. p. 228. ISBN 978-1-58648-606-8.
- Anwar, Etin (2004). "Harem". In Richard C. Martin (ed.). Encyclopedia of Islam and the Muslim World. MacMillan Reference USA.
- Bearman, P.; Bianquis, Th.; Bosworth, C. E.; van Donzel, E.; Heinrichs, W. P., eds. (1978). Encyclopaedia of Islam (2nd ed.). Brill.
- Betzig, Laura (March 1994). "Sex in History". Michigan Today. University of Michigan. Archived from the original on 11 September 2013.
- Britannica (2002). "Harem". Encyclopaedia Britannica.
- Brosius, Maria (1996). Women in ancient Persia (559–331 BC). Oxford.
- Cartwright-Jones, Catherine (2013). "Harem". The Oxford Encyclopedia of Islam and Women. Oxford: Oxford University Press. doi:10.1093/acref:oiso/9780199764464.001.0001. ISBN 978-0-19-976446-4.
- Cortese, Delia; Calderini, Simonetta (2006). Women And the Fatimids in the World of Islam. Edinburgh University Press. ISBN 0-7486-1732-9.
- Cuno, Kenneth (2015). Modernizing Marriage: Family, Ideology, and Law in Nineteenth- and Early Twentieth-Century Egypt. Syracuse University Press. ISBN 978-0-8156-3392-1.
- Doumato, Eleanor Abdella (2009). "Seclusion". In John L. Esposito (ed.). The Oxford Encyclopedia of the Islamic World. Oxford: Oxford University Press. Archived from the original on 6 March 2021.
- Duben, Alan; Behar, Cem (2002). Istanbul Households: Marriage, Family and Fertility, 1880–1940. Cambridge University Press. ISBN 978-0-521-52303-5.
- Fay, Mary Ann (2012). Unveiling the Harem: Elite Women and the Paradox of Seclusion in Eighteenth-Century Cairo. Syracuse University Press. ISBN 978-0-8156-5170-3.
- Fisher, William Bayne; Jackson, Peter; Lockhart, Lawrence, eds. (1986). The Cambridge History of Iran. Vol. 6. Cambridge University Press.
- Goodwin, Godfrey (1997). The Private World of Ottoman Women. London: Saqi Books. ISBN 978-0-86356-751-3.
- Haslauer, Elfriede (2005). "Harem". The Oxford Encyclopedia of Ancient Egypt. Oxford: Oxford University Press. doi:10.1093/acref/9780195102345.001.0001. ISBN 978-0-19-510234-5.
- Faroqhi, Suraiya (2006). The Ottoman Empire and the World Around It.
- Madar, Heather (2011). "Before the Odalisque: Renaissance Representations of Elite Ottoman Women". Early Modern Women. 6: 1–41. doi:10.1086/EMW23617325. S2CID 164805076.
- Marzolph, Ulrich (2004). "Eunuchs". The Arabian Nights Encyclopedia. ABC-CLIO.
- Nath, Renuka (1990). Notable Mughal and Hindu women in the 16th and 17th centuries A.D. New Delhi: Inter-India Publ. ISBN 978-81-210-0241-7.
- Patel, Youshaa (2013). "Seclusion". The Oxford Encyclopedia of Islam and Women. Oxford: Oxford University Press. Archived from the original on 7 September 2020.
- Quataert, Donald (2005). The Ottoman Empire, 1700–1922. Cambridge University Press. ISBN 978-0-521-83910-5.
- Rodriguez, J.P. (1997). "Ottoman Empire". The Historical Encyclopedia of World Slavery. ABC-CLIO.
- Roemer, H. R. "The Safavid Period". In Fisher, Jackson & Lockhart (1986).
- Savory, R. M. (1977). "Safavid Persia". In P. M. Holt; Ann K. S. Lambton; Bernard Lewis (eds.). The Cambridge History of Islam. The Central Islamic Lands from Pre-Islamic Times to the First World War. Vol. 1A. Cambridge University Press.
- Savory, R. M. "The Safavid Administrative System". In Fisher, Jackson & Lockhart (1986).
- Wehr, Hans; Cowan, J. Milton (1976). A Dictionary of Modern Written Arabic (3rd ed.). Spoken Language Services.

=== Further reading ===
- İlhan Akşit. The Mystery of the Ottoman Harem. Akşit Kültür Turizm Yayınları. ISBN 975-7039-26-8
- Alev Lytle Croutier. Harem: The World Behind the Veil, reprint ed. Abbeville Publishing Group (Abbeville Press, Inc.), 1998. ISBN 1-55859-159-1 (first published by Abbeville Press in 1989).
- Alev Lytle Croutier. Harem: The World Behind the Veil, 25th anniversary edition. New York Abbeville Press, 2014 ISBN 978-0-7892-1206-1
- Alan Duben, Cem Behar, Richard Smith (Series editor), Jan De Vries (Series editor), Paul Johnson (Series editor), Keith Wrightson (Series editor). Istanbul Households: Marriage, Family and Fertility, 1880–1940, new ed. Cambridge University Press, 2002. ISBN 0-521-52303-6
- John Freely. Inside the Seraglio: Private Lives of the Sultans in Istanbul: The Sultan's Harem, new ed. Penguin (Non-Classics), 2001. ISBN 0-14-027056-6
- Shapi Kaziev. Concubines. The secret life of the eastern harem ISBN 978-5-906842-39-8
- Kishori Saran Lal (1988). The Mughal Harem. New Delhi: Aditya Prakashan. ISBN 978-81-85179-03-2.
- Reina Lewis. Rethinking Orientalism: Women, Travel, And The Ottoman Harem. Rutgers University Press, 2004 ISBN 9780813535432
- Fatima Mernissi. Dreams of Trespass: Tales of a Harem Girlhood. Perseus, 1994
- Leslie P. Peirce (1993). The Imperial Harem: Women and Sovereignty in the Ottoman Empire. Oxford University Press. ISBN 0-19-508677-5.
- N. M. Penzer. The Harēm : Inside the Grand Seraglio of the Turkish Sultans. Dover Publications, 2005. ISBN 0-486-44004-4 (reissue of: The Harēm: An Account of the Institution as it Existed in the Palace of the Turkish Sultans with a History of the Grand Seraglio from its Foundation to the Present Time; 1936)
- M. Saalih. Harem Girl: A Harem Girl's Journal reprint ed. Delta, 2002. ISBN 0-595-31300-0 (erotic novel)
- Royal French Women in the Ottoman Sultans' Harem: The Political Uses of Fabricated Accounts from the Sixteenth to the Twenty-first Century
