= Residential architecture in Historic Cairo =

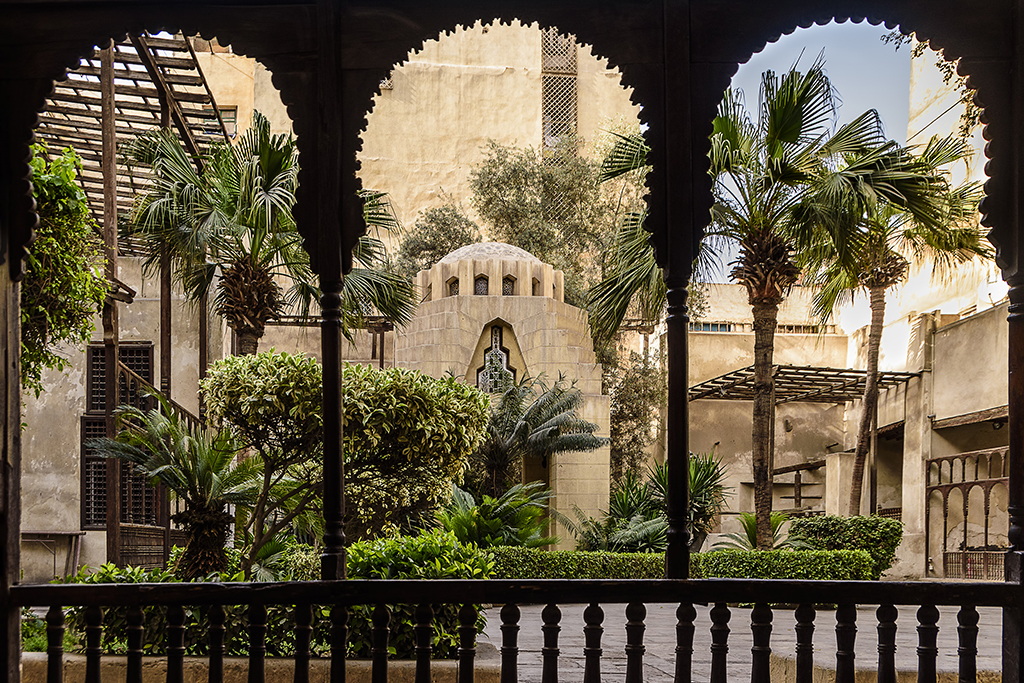
Bayt Al-Suhaymi, built in 1648 in Historic Cairo

The residential architecture in Historic Cairo covers the area that was built during the Fatimid, Ayyubid, Mamluk, Ottoman, French occupation and even Mohamed Ali periods. Historic Cairo covers an area of around 523.66 ha on the eastern bank of the Nile river and is surrounded by the modern quarters of Greater Cairo. First report of activities (July 2010 – June 2012) of Urban Regeneration Project for Historic Cairo set a map to compare the world heritage property and buffer zone in different institutions such as (URHC) & Supreme Council of Antiquities (SCA).

Historical Cairo area "Islamic Medieval architecture in Cairo" has witnessed many successful patterns for housing design. Environmental and social factors were accurately included in the housing design with different typologies during Mamluk, Ottoman, and 19th century periods in Cairo. Brief explanations for these types will be in the following sections.

== Types of residential architecture during Mamluk and Ottoman Eras ==
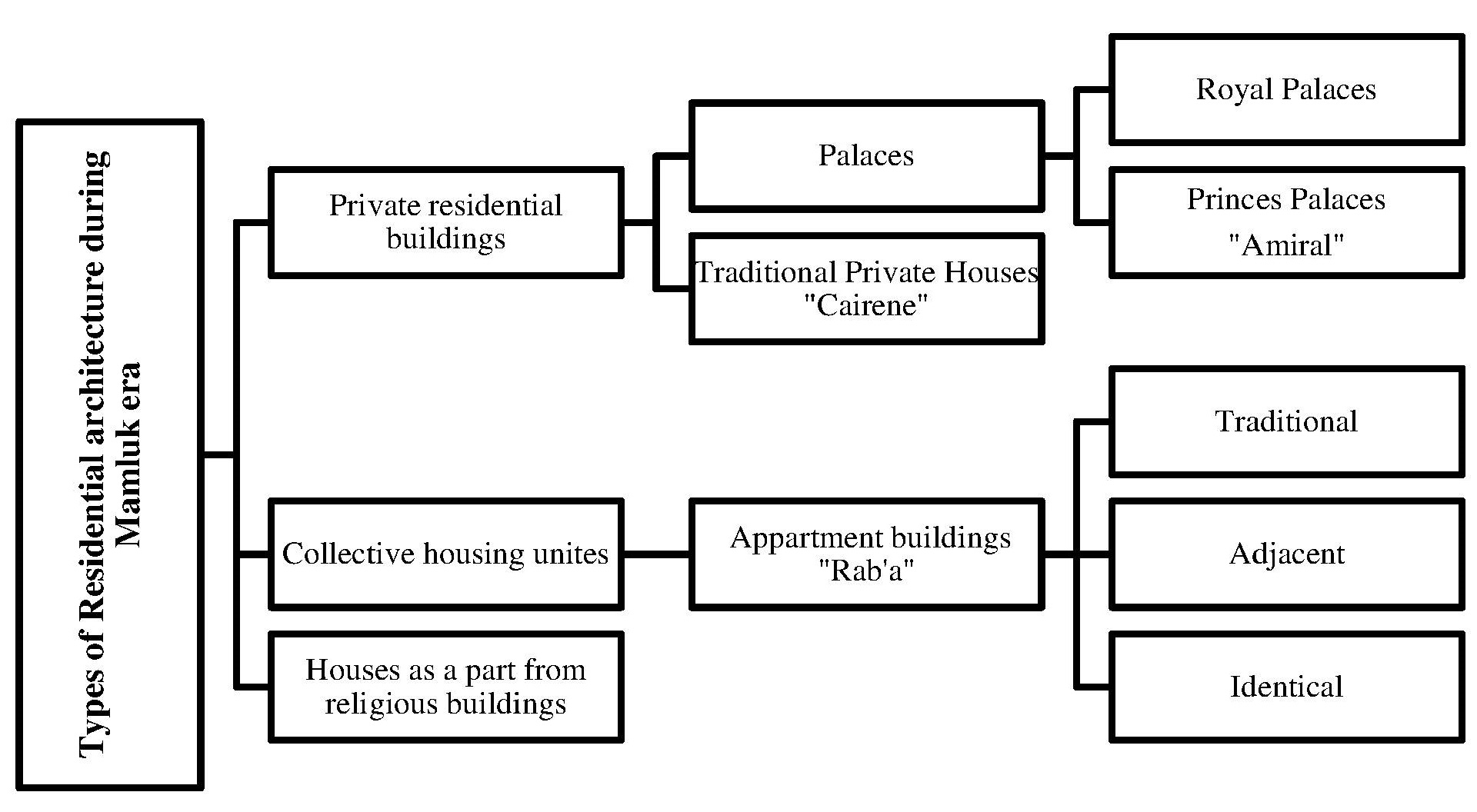
Types of residential architecture during Mamluk and Ottoman eras

Mamluk and Ottoman eras were rich of various types of residential buildings. The main types of those residential buildings are: palaces, private houses, apartment buildings, as well as residential attachments to religious buildings. Each one of them has its own specific characteristics that distinguish it from others. Fortunately, there are some buildings that survived in the historic Cairo area.

The definitions of the typical residential types during the Mamluk and Ottoman eras will be as the following:

- Palace: a large and richly furnished building resembling the high class and used also for official meetings and events.
- Cairene private house: They are traditional residential architecture in Cairo from late Mamluk era (1259–1517) and throughout the Ottoman era (1517–1805), where the idea of a private house was consistent.
- Rab’a: collective houses type for people with limited income or for traders and their families. It is located above Wekala building, in the upper floor and it has a separate entrance, or it is located in a separate buildings.

== Stylistic features in Mamluk and Ottoman residential buildings ==
Stylistic features are the basic elements that influenced housing design to achieve privacy as a social aspect and climate treatment as an environmental aspect. Hence, these architectural features influenced the housing design and achieved different architectural solutions for residential buildings during Mamluk and beginning of Ottoman eras.

These features on floor plan levels are:

- Bent entrance
- Inner courtyard
- Space for men "Salamlik" includes:
  - Reception hall "Qa'a"
  - Receiving area off the courtyard house "Takhtabush"
- Space for women "Haramlik" includes:
  - Sitting area "Maq'ad"

These features on elevation and section levels are:

- Perforated wooden screen on windows "mashrabiya"
- Rooftop wind scoop "Malqaf"
- External house walls and opening characteristics
- Building materials

The definitions of these architectural features will be as the following:

=== Bent entrance ===
This is a bent walkway into the inside of the house.

=== Internal courtyard ===
It is a square or rectangular open space in the center of the house surrounded by house elements such as "Qa'a" and "Tahtabush".

=== Space for men "Salamlik" ===
The selamlik is a space to receive male guests and it is located on the ground floor and it consists of "Qa'a" and "Tahtabush".

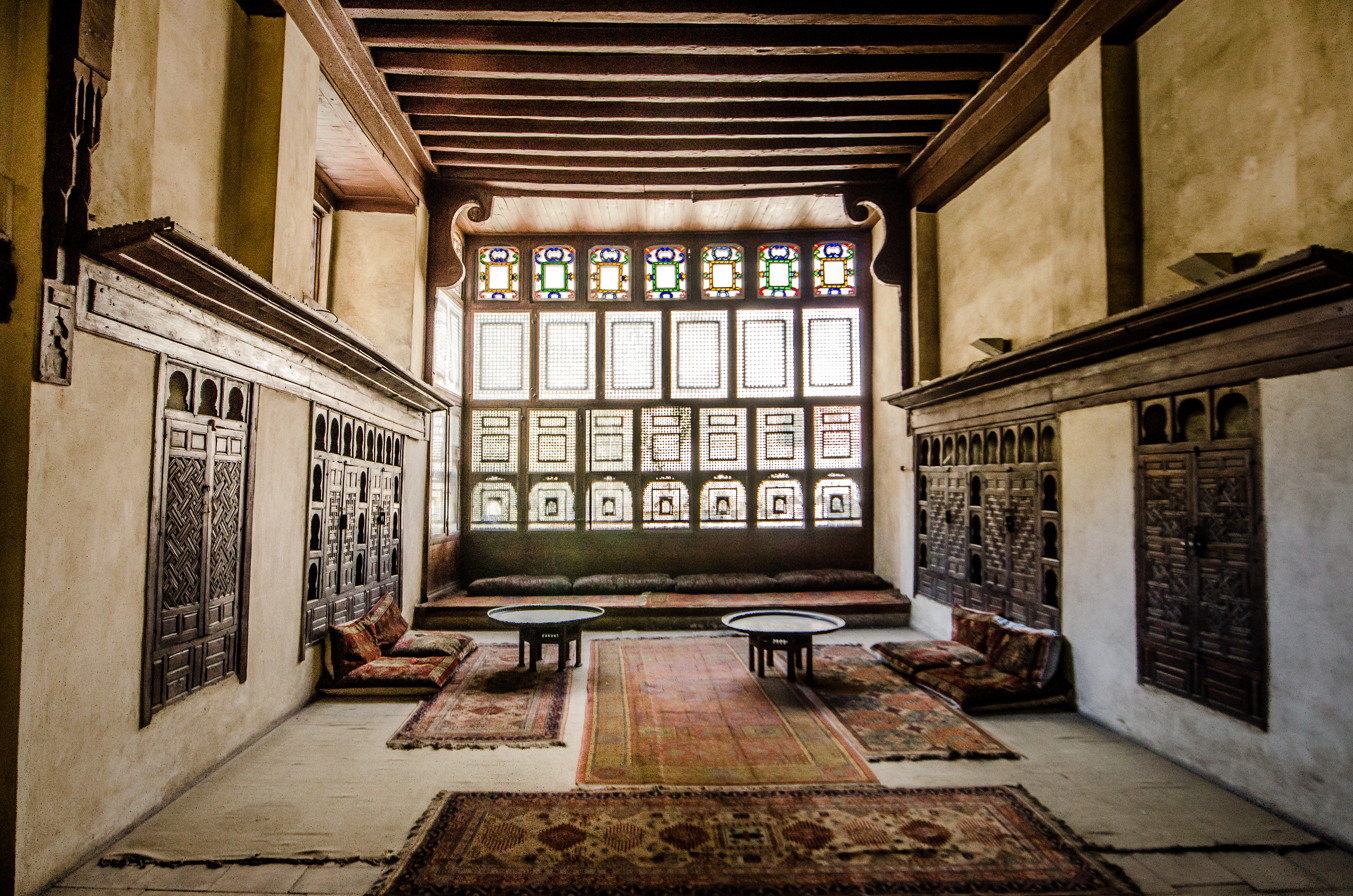
Qa'a ("Reception Hall") at Bayt Al-Suhaymi

=== Reception hall "Qa'a" ===
The qa'a is a large hall to receive male guests.

=== Receiving area off the courtyard house "Takhtabush" ===
It is a sitting area to welcome common people on ground floor.

=== Space for women "Haramlik" ===
The haremlik is a space for women and children to sleep and live. It is located on the upper floors, first floor, and it has a separated entrance.

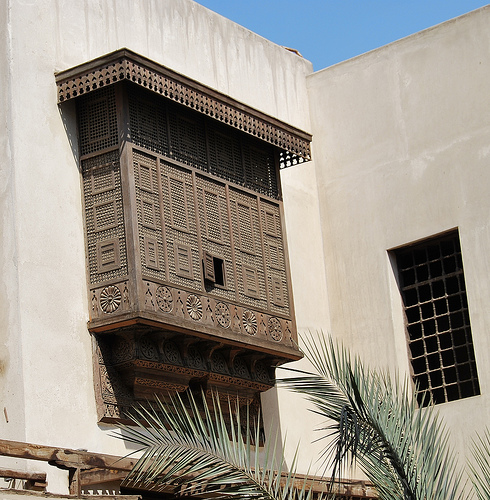
Mashrabiya in Cairo

=== Sitting area "Maq'ad" ===
It is a sitting area for family members, the family's master, children and close friends. It is located on the first floor and the sleeping areas are attached to it.

=== Perforated wooden screen on window "Mashrabiya" ===
The mashrabiya is a perforated wooden screen on windows. It was installed between the "Haramlik" and the following elements: "Salamlik", internal courtyard and streets.

=== Rooftop wind scoop "Malqaf" ===
It is a square windcatcher structure built on the roof floor and usually it is located on the roof of the reception hall or in the lobbies front of them. It has an inclined roof from brick or wood or glass.

=== External house walls and opening characteristics ===
It must be built to a height that ensures that the domestic interior cannot be overlooked and that intruders are discouraged. Any openings in the ground floor are small, grilled and above the line of vision of passersby. The windows of upper floors are generally larger and may project considerably; through admitting light and air, they must not overlook neighboring courtyards or terraces.

== Types of residential architecture during 19th century ==
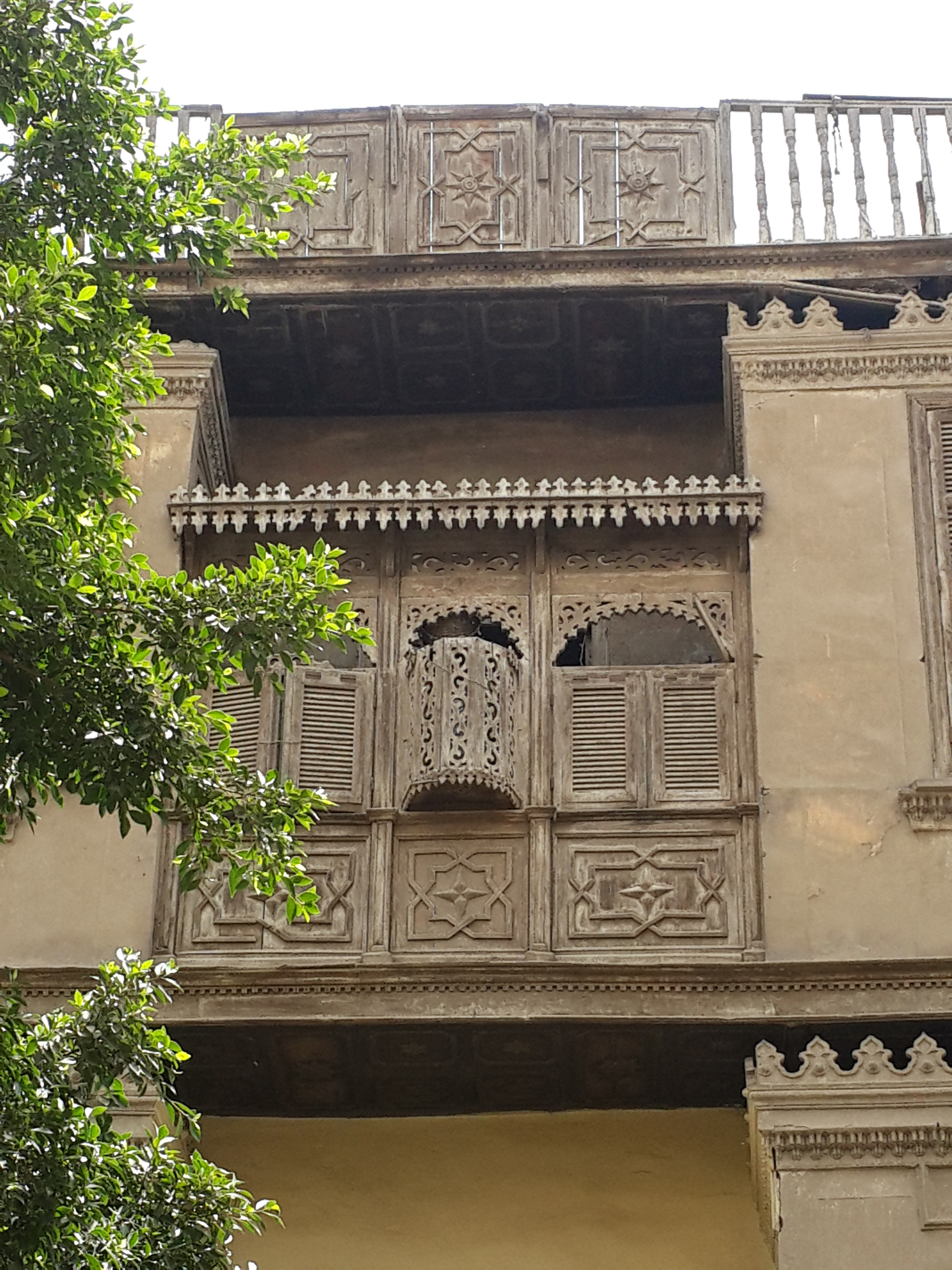
Al-Ghandur house- 19th-century house in Historical Borders of Cairo in 2016

The residential houses from 19th century that are located in the historic Cairo area are related to the middle-class category. These houses were influenced by the earlier medieval residential architectural style as well as they shared many similarities in the plan and function from Turkish houses. They constitute the link between the contemporary and the earlier medieval architecture.

There are three main types of houses of the 19th century. These types are classified according to the design of the house and the number of families living inside, as the following:

=== The single family house ===
These houses were designed to accommodate one family and close relatives, in addition to servants, guards and helpers. Sukkar house/Bayt Sukkar is an example for this type. This house has more than one floor above the ground. The owner's family used to live in the first floor. Also, there is a mezzanine floor for storage, kitchen facilities, and residence for servants.

=== The block of houses around a court ===
This type was common in the 19th century due to the increased density in historic Cairo. It was designed for more than one family, each family has a separate house. The houses form one building used to be distributed around one open courtyard and each house had a private staircase from the courtyard to the upper floors. The design had two apartments per floor and each apartment was built on a small lot of land. Al-Sitt Sakna house is an example for this type.

=== The traditional apartment buildings ===
This type is an apartment building. The apartment building contains two or three apartments. The area of each one is around 30m^{2} and 45m^{2}. In some cases, there will be one apartment on each floor. Usually, the apartment building had two floors above the ground floor. This type had an indication for increasing the population in the city center. So, the requirement for rental housing units on small lots of land was mandatory. House of Abu al-Hassan is an example for this type.

== See also ==
- Mamluk architecture
- Ottoman architecture in Egypt
- Windcatcher
- Egyptian Laws and Legislations Related to Conserving Cultural Heritage in Historic Cairo Area
- Historic house architecture in Morocco
