= Hala Sultan Tekke =

Tekke in Larnaca, Cyprus

- Τεκές Χαλά Σουλτάνας / Hala Sultan Tekkesi
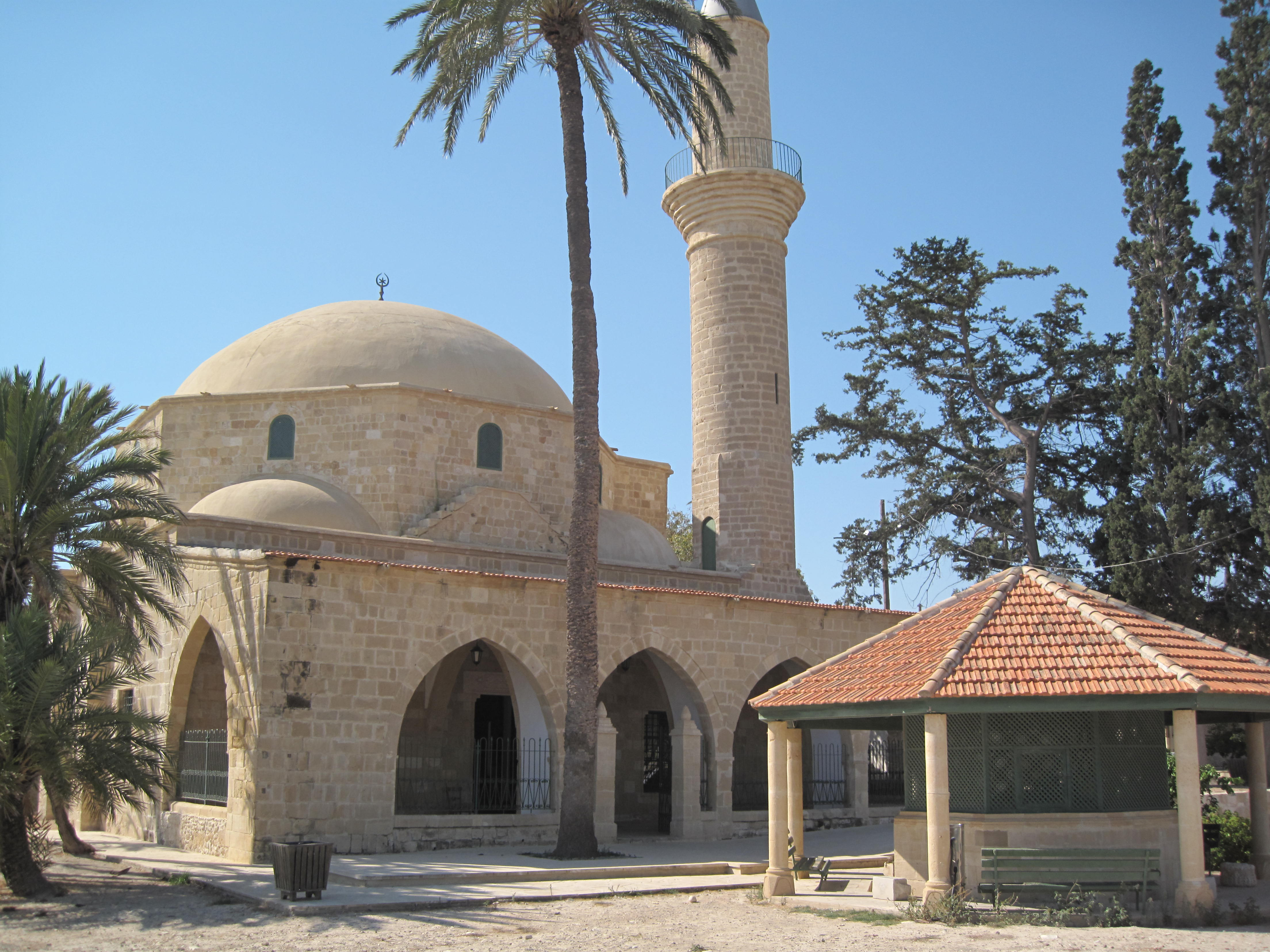
- Hala Sultan Tekke

- Location within Cyprus

Religion
- Affiliation: Islam
- District: Larnaca District

Location
- Location: Larnaca, Cyprus
- Coordinates: 34.885277°N 33.610013°E

Architecture
- Type: Mosque
- Style: Ottoman

Specifications
- Dome: Two
- Minaret: One

Hala Sultan Tekke (Greek: Τεκές Χαλά Σουλτάνας Tekés Chalá Soultánas; Turkish: Hala Sultan Tekkesi) is a mosque and takya (or tekke in Turkish) on the west bank of Larnaca Salt Lake, in Larnaca, Cyprus. Umm Haram, known as Hala Sultan in Turkish tradition, was the wife of Ubada bin al-Samit, a companion of the Islamic prophet Muhammad, and foster sister of Muhammad's mother, Amina.

Hala Sultan Tekke complex is composed of a mosque, mausoleum, cemetery, and living quarters for men and women. The term tekke (lodge) applies to a building designed specifically for gatherings of a Sufi brotherhood, or tariqa, and may have referred to an earlier feature of the location. The present-day complex lies on the shores of the Larnaca Salt Lake, an important site in prehistory, and near an archaeological site dating to the Bronze Age. Hala Sultan Tekke is a listed Ancient Monument.

== History ==
=== Antiquity ===
During the second half of the second millennium B.C, the area of the Hala Sultan Tekke was used as a cemetery by the people who lived in a large Late Cypriote town a few hundred meters to the West. Originally identified as an archaeological site following looting in the 1890s, numerous tombs of Late Bronze Age date (around 1650-1100 BC) with rich contents were excavated by the British Museum in 1897–1898 directed by Henry Beauchamp Walters and then John Winter Crowfoot; the finds were divided between the British Museum and the Cyprus Museum. The contemporary settlement was identified by Swedish archaeologist Arne Furumark in 1947 and some preliminary excavations conducted by the Department of Antiquities. A part of this town was excavated from the 1970s onward by a Swedish archaeological mission led by Professor Paul Åström, and proved to be a major urban centre of Late Bronze Age Cyprus

Beginning in 2010 and continuing to the present excavations at Hala Sultan Tekke, The New Swedish Cyprus Expedition have been carried out by Professor Peter M. Fischer from the University of Gothenburg, Sweden. In 2018, Fischer uncovered several tombs at the site that are being explored carefully. The tombs date to 1500 and 1350 BC and contained artifacts of the Bronze Age that demonstrate the extensive trade of goods existing at the time.

Radar surveys (2010–2012) have demonstrated that the city was one of the largest in the Late Bronze Age (roughly 1600–1100 BC), maybe as large as 50 ha. Another archaeological investigation conducted by the Department of Antiquities under the women's quarter of Hala Sultan Tekke have revealed building remains dated to the late Archaic, Classical, and Hellenistic periods (sixth to first century BC). Several finds indicate that the site might have been used as a sanctuary but the limited scale of the investigations precludes definite conclusions about its use.

=== Ottoman era ===
Most accounts establish a connection between the site and the death of Umm Haram during the first Arab conquest of Cyprus under the Caliph Muawiyah between 647 and 649, which were later pursued throughout the Umayyad and the Abbasid periods. According to these accounts, Umm Haram, being of very old age, had fallen from her mule and had died during a siege of Larnaca. She was later buried where she died. According to Shia belief, her grave lies within Jannatul Baqi cemetery in Madinah, Saudi Arabia.

During the Ottoman administration of Cyprus, a mosque complex was built in stages around the tomb. The tomb was discovered in the 18th century by the dervish called Sheikh Hasan, who also built the first structure here. Dervish Hasan managed to convince the administrative and religious authorities of the site's sacred nature and with the permission he received, he built the shrine around the tomb in 1760 and had it decorated. The wooden fences around the tomb would have been built by the 19th-century Ottoman governor in Cyprus, Seyyid Elhac Mehmed Agha, which were replaced by fences in bronze and two doors by his successor Acem Ali Agha.

In another account, Giovanni Mariti, who visited Cyprus between 1760 and 1767, wrote that the shrine was built by the Cyprus governor he names as Ali Agha. According to Mariti, until 1760 they used the stones of a standing church in a ruined village nearby as construction materials. In another source, it is mentioned that the construction of the mosque was initiated by the Cyprus governor Seyyid Mehmed Emin Efendi in classical Ottoman style, and it was completed in November 1817.

The ancillary buildings have been repaired in 2004, and the mosque and the minaret are currently being restored. Both of these initiatives have been carried out with support from the Bi-communal Development Programme, which is funded from USAID and UNDP, and implemented through UNOPS.

== Layout ==
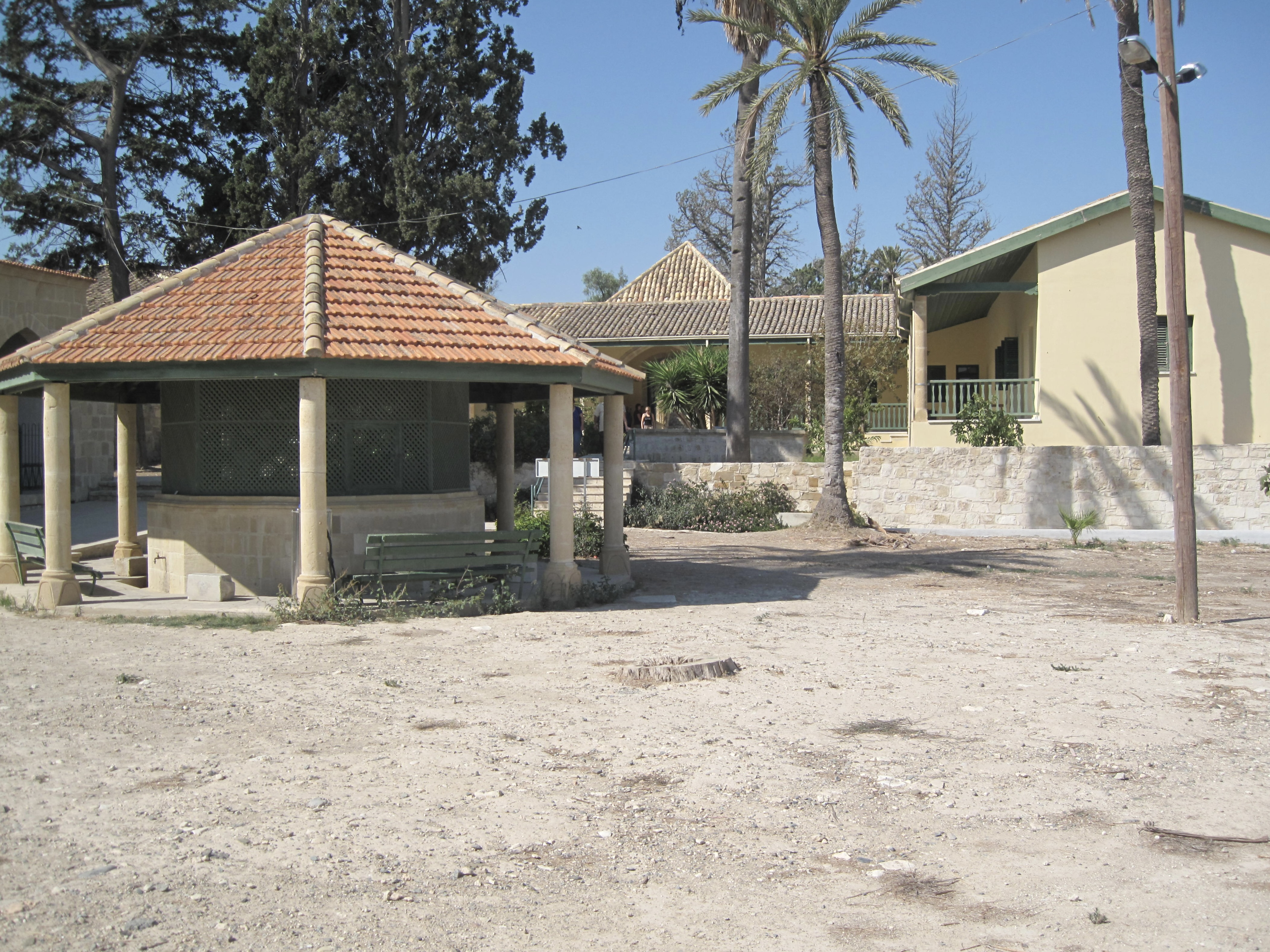
Courtyard with ablution area

Above the entry gate to Tekke garden is an Ottoman inscription dated 4 March 1813. Sultan Mahmud II's monogram appears on both sides of the inscription and reads, "Hala Sultan Tekke was built by God's beloved great Ottoman Cyprus governor". The garden itself was designed by a pasha and came to be known as "Pasha garden". The complex of buildings adjacent to the Tekke was known as "Gülşen-Feyz" (the rose garden of plenitude or of enlightenment). To the north (left) of the entrance there used to be a guesthouse for men. On the right side of the entrance, there was another guesthouse of which one block was reserved for men (Selamlik) and the other for women (Haremlik). It was a custom for visitors to take the oath of dedication to serve the Hala Sultan Tekke if their wishes were realized. The domed mosque is square-shaped with a balcony and was built in yellow stone blocks. The minaret was repaired in 1959.

Umm Haram's tomb is located behind the mosque wall of the qibla (in the direction of Mecca). A further inscription dated 1760 is found here. Aside her, there are four other tombs, two of them former sheikhs. Another important tomb is a two-leveled marble sarcophagus, carrying the date 12 July 1929. The tomb belongs to Adile Hüseyin Ali, who was the Turkish wife of the Hussein bin Ali, Sharif of Mecca of the Hashemite House, himself a grandson of the Ottoman grand vizier Koca Mustafa Reşid Pasha and a descendant of Muhammad. At the eastern corner of the mosque and the Tekke, there is a cemetery, which was closed to burials at around 1899. A number of past Turkish administrators are buried here.

Opposite the mosque, there is an octagonal fountain, which was built around 1796-1797 by the then governor of Cyprus Silahtar Kaptanbaşı Mustafa Agha. The information on the construction is recorded on the marble inscription located on the fountain. On another inscription dated 1895, which was recently discovered in the Tekke's garden, it is written that the infrastructure for bringing in the water was built upon the instructions of the Sultan Abdülhamid II.

== Significance ==
While being acknowledged as a holy site for Turkish Cypriot Muslims, the mosque has also been described by contemporary sources as revered by all Muslims. In an assessment of the environmental and cultural assets of Cyprus, Professor George E. Bowen, a senior Fulbright scholar at the University of Tennessee, described Hala Sultan Tekke as the third holiest place for Muslims in the world. This view has been echoed by other sources including the United Nations Development Programme in Cyprus and the Cypriot administration's Department of Antiquities. Others describe the site as fourth most important in the Islamic world, after Mecca, Medina, and Jerusalem. As a result of the site being located in the Greek non-Muslim sector of the divided island, pilgrimage visits to the site are infrequent.

In addition to interventions at the imperial level and by high-ranking administrators for the maintenance and development of the complex, during the Ottoman Empire, Ottoman-flagged ships would hang their flags at half mast when off the shores of Larnaca, and salute Hala Sultan with cannon shots.

== Gallery ==
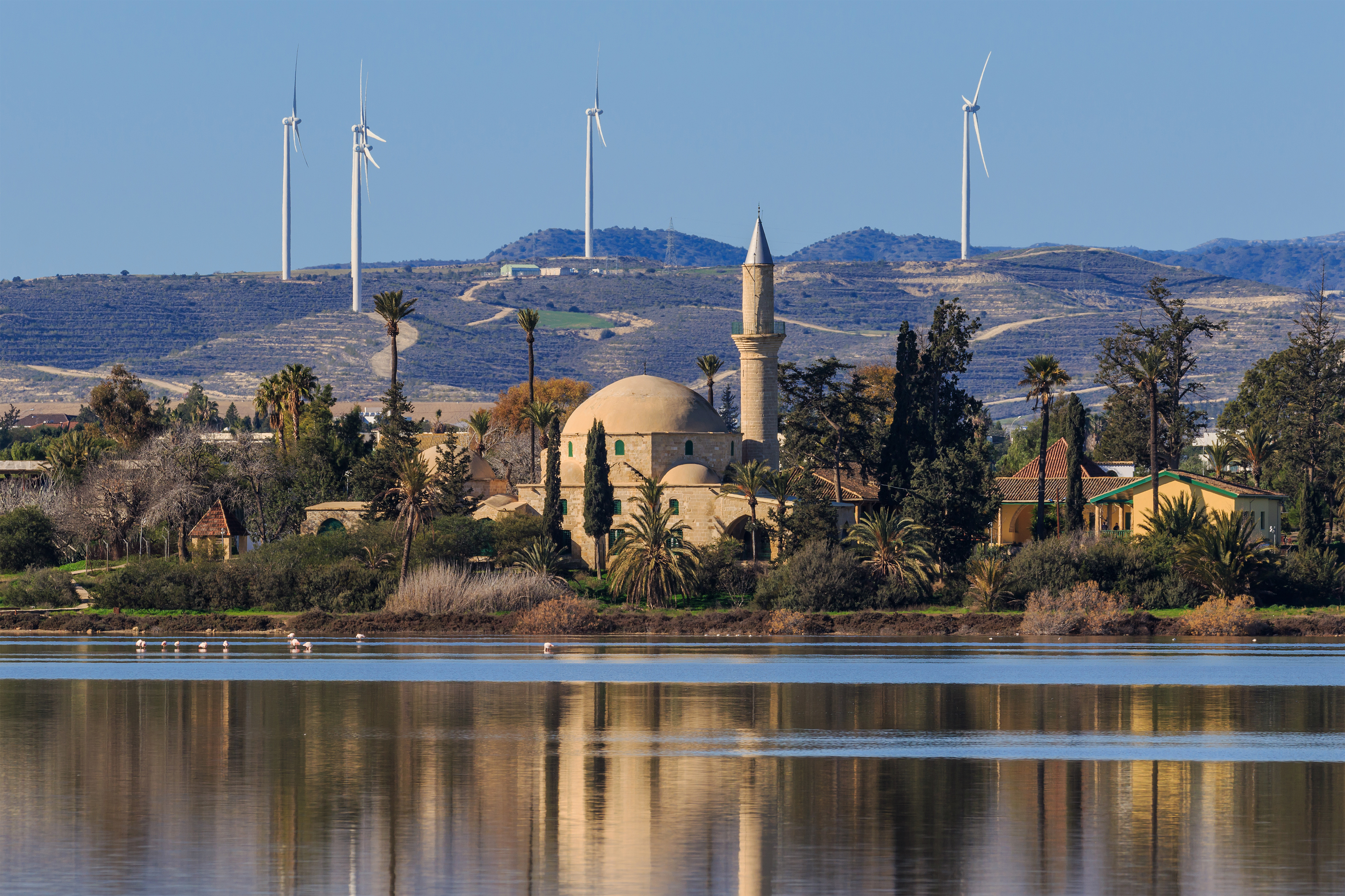
Hala Sultan Tekke with Larnaca Salt Lake in the foreground

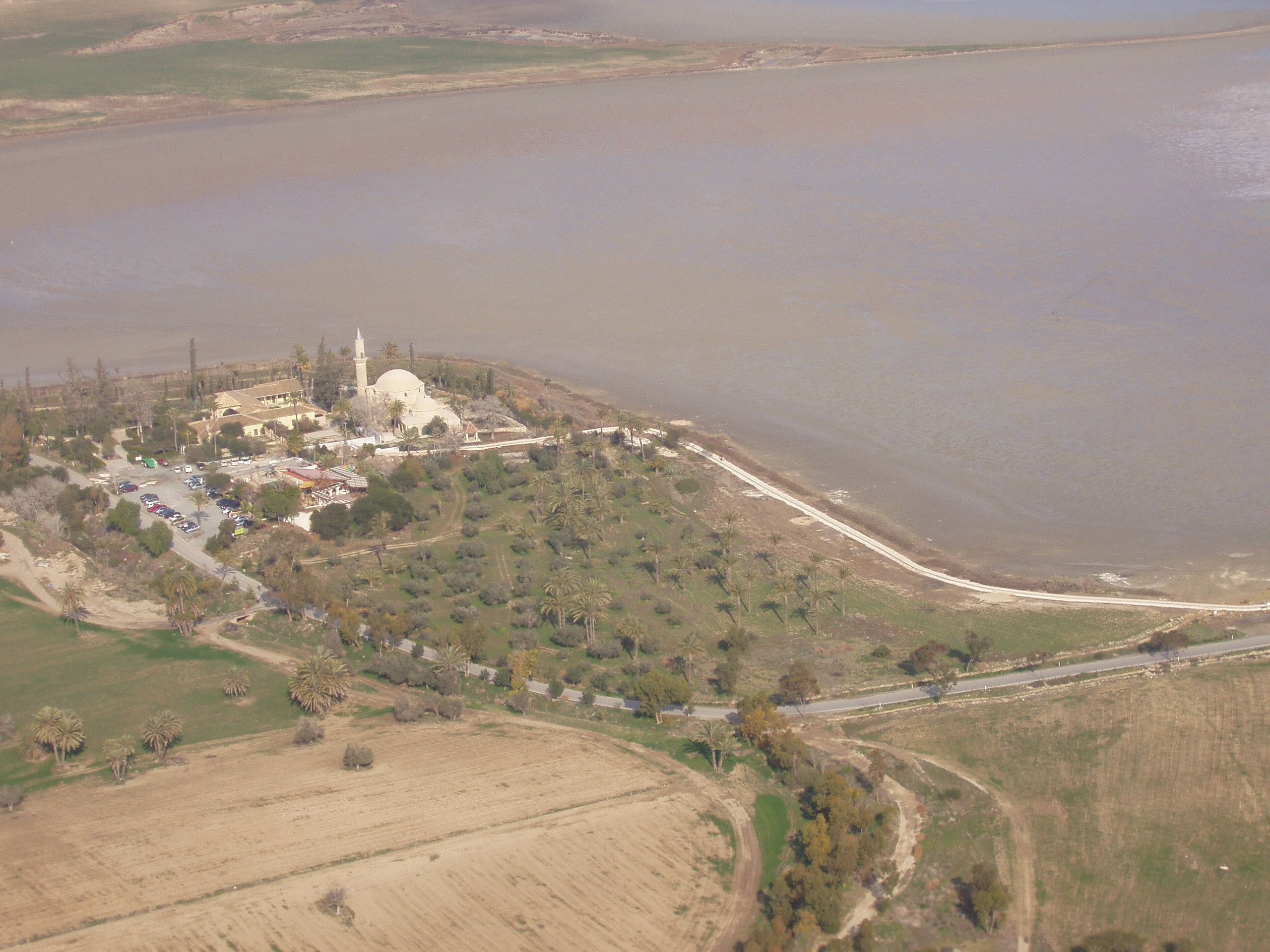
Aerial photo of the Larnaca Salt Lake (in winter) with Hala Sultan Tekke

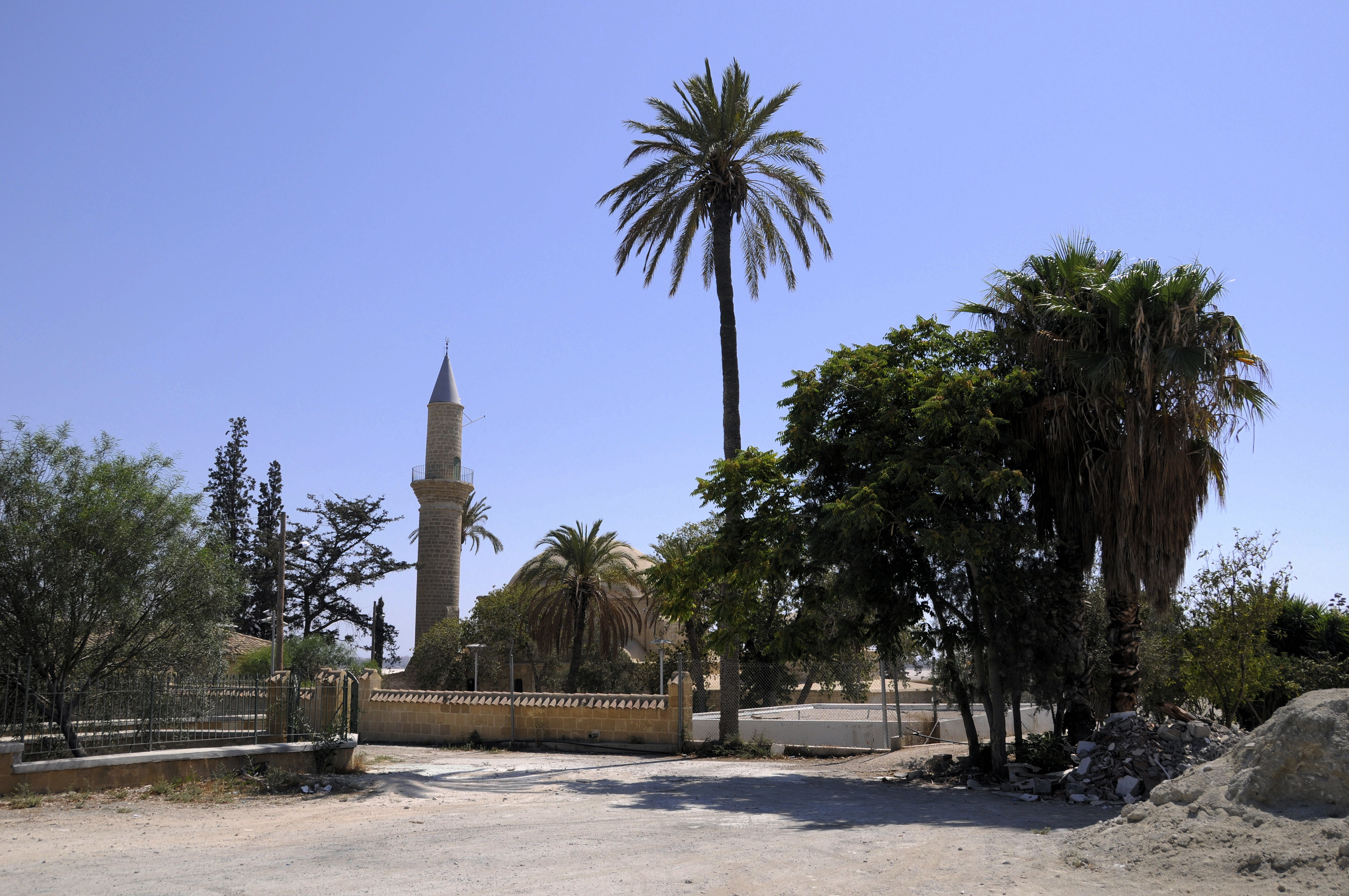
The Hala Sultan Tekke.

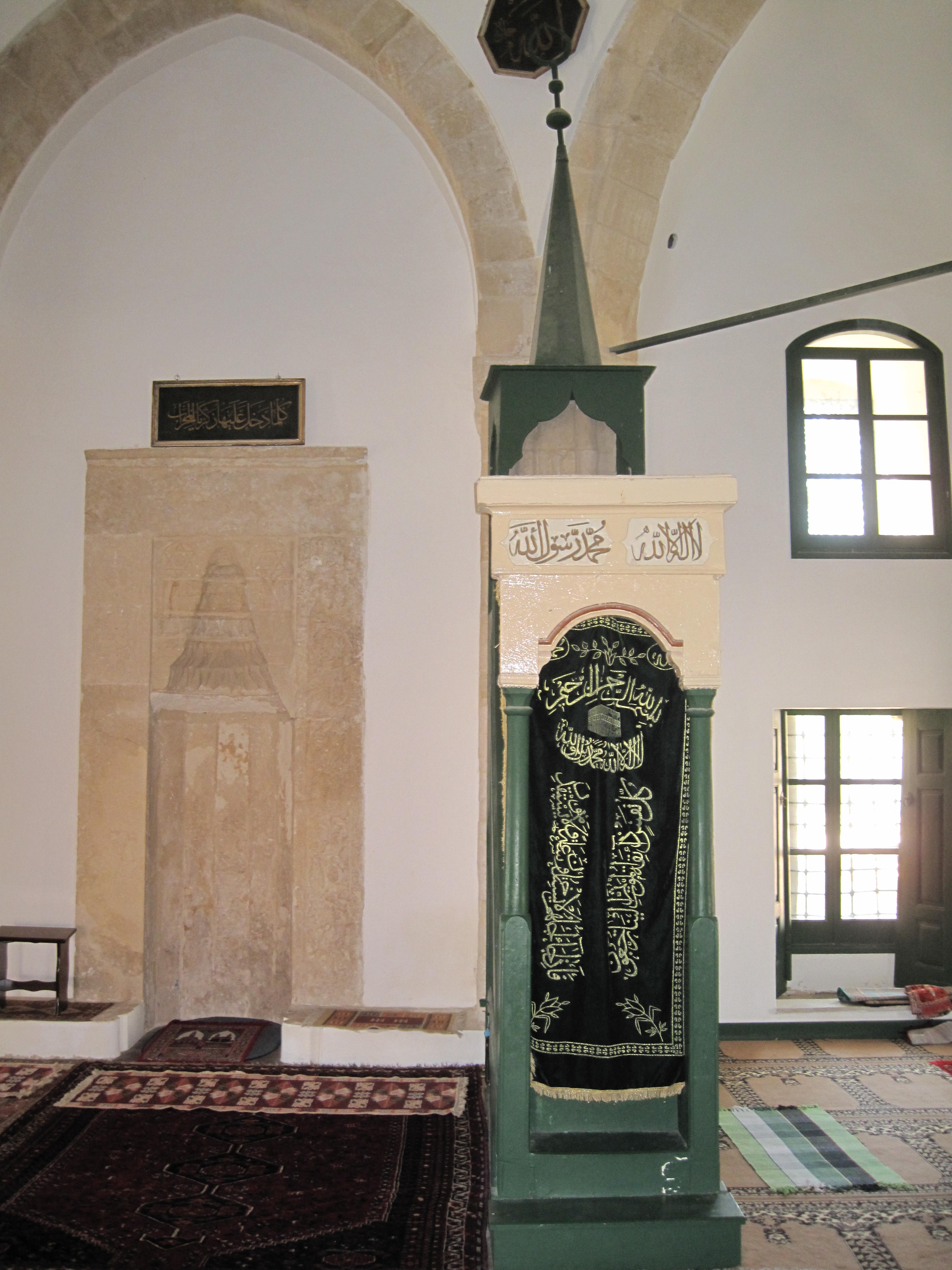
Inside the Hala Sultan Tekke

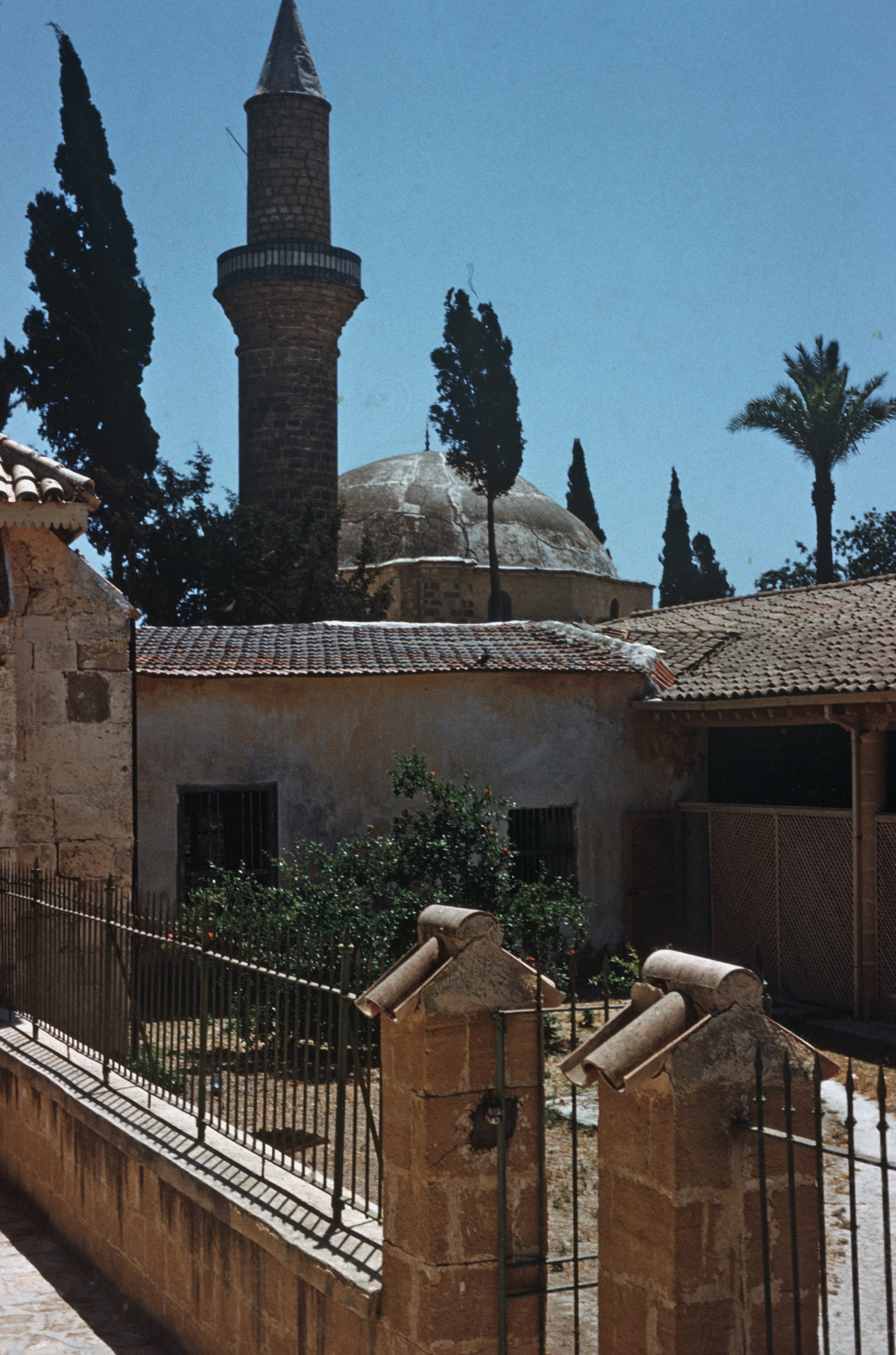
Hala Sultan Tekke behind a small courtyard in 1958

== See also ==
- List of mosques in Cyprus
- Islam in Cyprus
