= Coffin of Nedjemankh =

Ancient Egyptian coffin

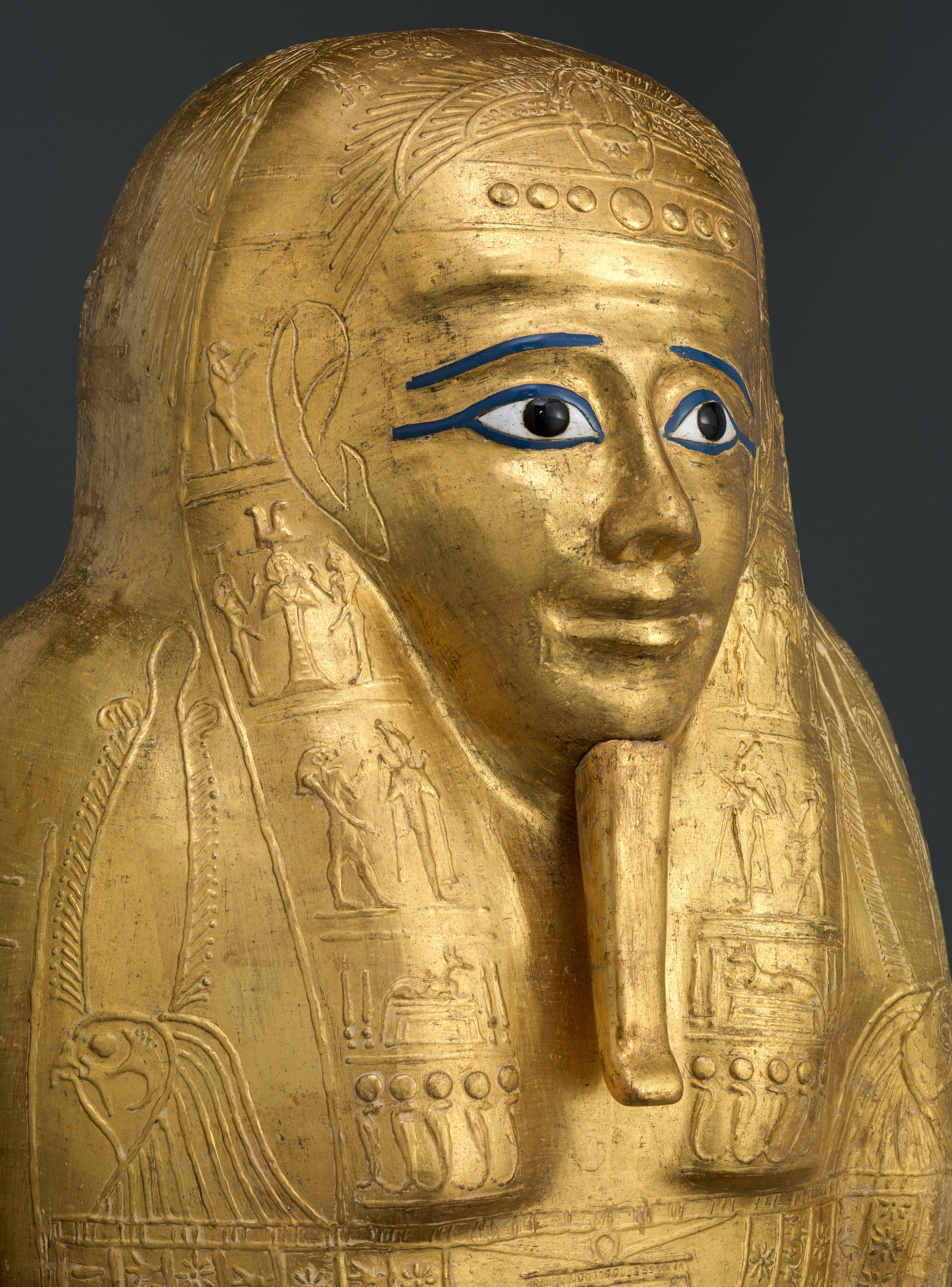
- Detail of the coffin of Nedjemankh
- Material: Cartonnage (linen, glue, and gesso), gesso, paint, gold, silver, resin, glass, wood, leaded bronze
- Created: 150–50 BC
- Discovered: 2011; Egypt

The coffin of Nedjemankh is a gilded ancient Egyptian coffin from the late Ptolemaic Period. It once encased the mummy of Nedjemankh, a priest of the ram-god Heryshaf. The coffin was purchased by the New York City Metropolitan Museum of Art in July 2017 to be the centerpiece of an exhibition entitled "Nedjemankh and His Gilded Coffin." The Metropolitan Museum of Art repatriated Nedjemankh and his coffin to Egypt in 2019, before the scheduled closure of the exhibition.

== Description ==
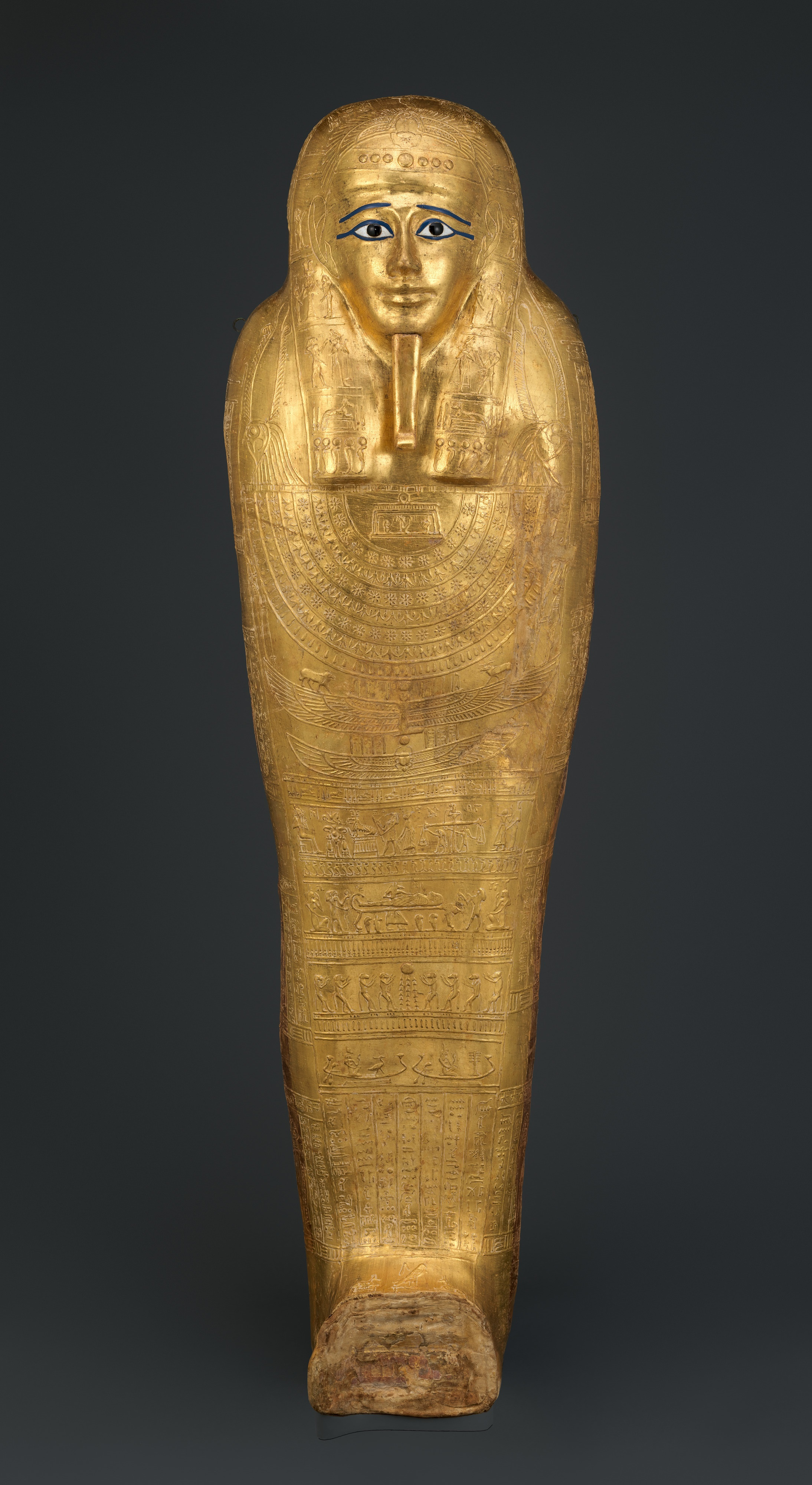
The lid of the coffin

The coffin comprises two components: a base and a lid. The base is 180 cm (71 in) tall, 54 cm (21 in) wide, and 12 cm (4.7 in) deep. The lid has a similar height and width—181 cm (71 in) and 53 cm (21 in), respectively—but is deeper, at 28 cm (11 in).

The base of the coffin is made of cartonnage—a material made of linen, glue, and gesso—as well as gesso, resin, and wood. The lid is made of cartonnage, gold, silver, gesso, resin, glass, and wood. The coffin also includes paint and leaded bronze.

The lid is covered with detailed vignettes, created through the pastiglia technique: raised gesso that was then gilded with gold or silver. The vignettes appear in other funerary contexts, including the Book of the Dead, and several are well known, including the weighing of the heart and embalming of the mummy. Another, rarer, vignette shows baboons worshipping the sun.

An inscription above the coffin's feet lists Nedjemankh's numerous titles: priest, Sameref-priest, priest who adorns the divine image, and priest of Heryshaf-who-resides-in-Herakleopolis. The titles suggest that Nedjemankh's career was devoted to Heryshaf, a god with the head of a ram. The inscription also provides a partial family tree, with the name of Nedjemankh's mother, Banabes.

The inscription above the lid's feet also includes hymn about gold, silver, and the flesh of the gods. The hymn is thus mirrored by the gold-covered exterior of the coffin, as well as the interior; there appears a figure of Nut, the goddess of the sky, partially covered with silver foil. In commissioning a coffin that reflected the metals invoked by the hymn, Nedjemankh forged a connection between himself and divinity.

On the base of the coffin there is a djed pillar. Such symbols represented stability and came to be understood as a representation of the backbone of Osiris. Several spells from The Book of the Dead use the symbol to help revive the dead for their rebirths into the afterlife.

== Provenance ==
=== Looting ===
The events surrounding the looting of the coffin are known through emails later obtained by prosecutors with the New York County District Attorney, and by information provided by one of the people involved in trafficking it. The coffin was looted from Egypt in October 2011, during a rash of looting accompanying the instability created by the 2011 Egyptian revolution and the Egyptian Crisis that followed. It was possibly found in the Minya region, where metadata shows that photos of the still-dirty coffin were taken, or in Abusir el-Meleq.

In late 2011 and early 2012, a looter sent six photographs of the coffin to Mohammed Jaradat, a Jordanian trafficker. One of the photos depicted a looter wearing a hoodie and crouched on a sand dune, holding an assault rifle across his chest. Jaradat forwarded the photographs to Roben Dib, a Lebanese antiquities dealer working with the Egyptian dealer Serop Simonian.

Around the same time, Jaradat offered the coffin to a Lebanese collector, Georges Lotfi, for $50,000; Lotfi declined. Jaradat instead ended up sending the coffin to Dib, who agreed to split the proceeds when it sold. Dib and Simonian thus coordinated the removal of the coffin to Europe, terming it "the big yellow one" in emails. The location of Nedjemankh's tomb and the fate of his mummy are currently unknown.

The coffin was smuggled out of Egypt around late 2012, and brought to Dubai in the United Arab Emirates. From there it was sent to Germany via FedEx; the shipping label described it as a "gypsum Wooden Box and lid" with a value of €5,000. The coffin was restored during its time in Germany.

=== Purchase ===
In 2015, Dib showed the coffin, then in a warehouse in Cologne, to the Parisian art dealer Christophe Kunicki. Kunicki, in turn, arranged for the coffin to be professionally photographed; in May 2016 he then emailed the photos to Diana Craig Patch, the curator in charge of the Metropolitan Museum of Art's Department of Egyptian Art. That summer, Patch viewed the coffin in Paris, where it had been moved.

According to the Met, speaking in 2019, the museum was shown forged documents regarding the coffin's provenance. The false provenance stated that the coffin once belonged to Habib Tawadrus, a dealer from at least 1936 who operated a shop (Habib & Company) across from Shepheard's Hotel in Cairo. In 1971, the false provenance continued, his heirs exported the coffin to Switzerland with authorization from the Egyptian Antiquities Organization and the Egyptian Museum; the purported date of export was twelve years before the passage of a 1983 law banning the removal of antiquities. The documents included what was said to be an official translation of the export license provided by the German embassy in Cairo in February 1977, for use by the European owner. The false provenance concluded by stating that that European owner had maintained possession until the present time.

Writing at the time of its purchase, the Met spent the year after being shown the coffin in 2016 undertaking "a careful study of its 1971 export license from Egypt, its subsequent history in a private collection, and the current structure and stability of the coffin". In July 2017, the museum purchased the coffin for €3.5 million from Kunicki. The museum announced the purchase in a press release on 12 September 2017. It assigned the base the accession number 2017.255a, and the lid 2017.255b.

=== Investigation ===
In fall 2017, Lotfi recognized the coffin while walking through the Met. He called Jaradat, who told him of sending it to Dib; contrary to Dib's promise to split the profits of any sale, however, Jaradat had heard nothing from him since. Jaradat was infuriated. In Lotfi's later telling, "He wanted to take revenge." In March 2018, therefore, Lotfi contacted Matthew Bogdanos, the prosecutor in charge of the Antiquities Trafficking Unit at the District Attorney of New York County, and introduced him to Jaradat.

Following the announcement that the provenance papers for the coffin had been forged, an investigation was launched. The Met stated that they would "pursue claims against all parties... involved in deceiving the museum." The French police had some suspicions that Roben Dib, a German-Lebanese art dealer had conspired with Kunicki to create forged documents and craft false provenance to launder artifacts looted throughout the Middle East during the unrest caused by the Egyptian Crisis/Arab Spring, including Nedjemankh's coffin. The results of the investigation led to Christophe Kunicki and his husband, Richard Semper, being charged with participation in gang fraud and money laundering.

== Return to Egypt ==
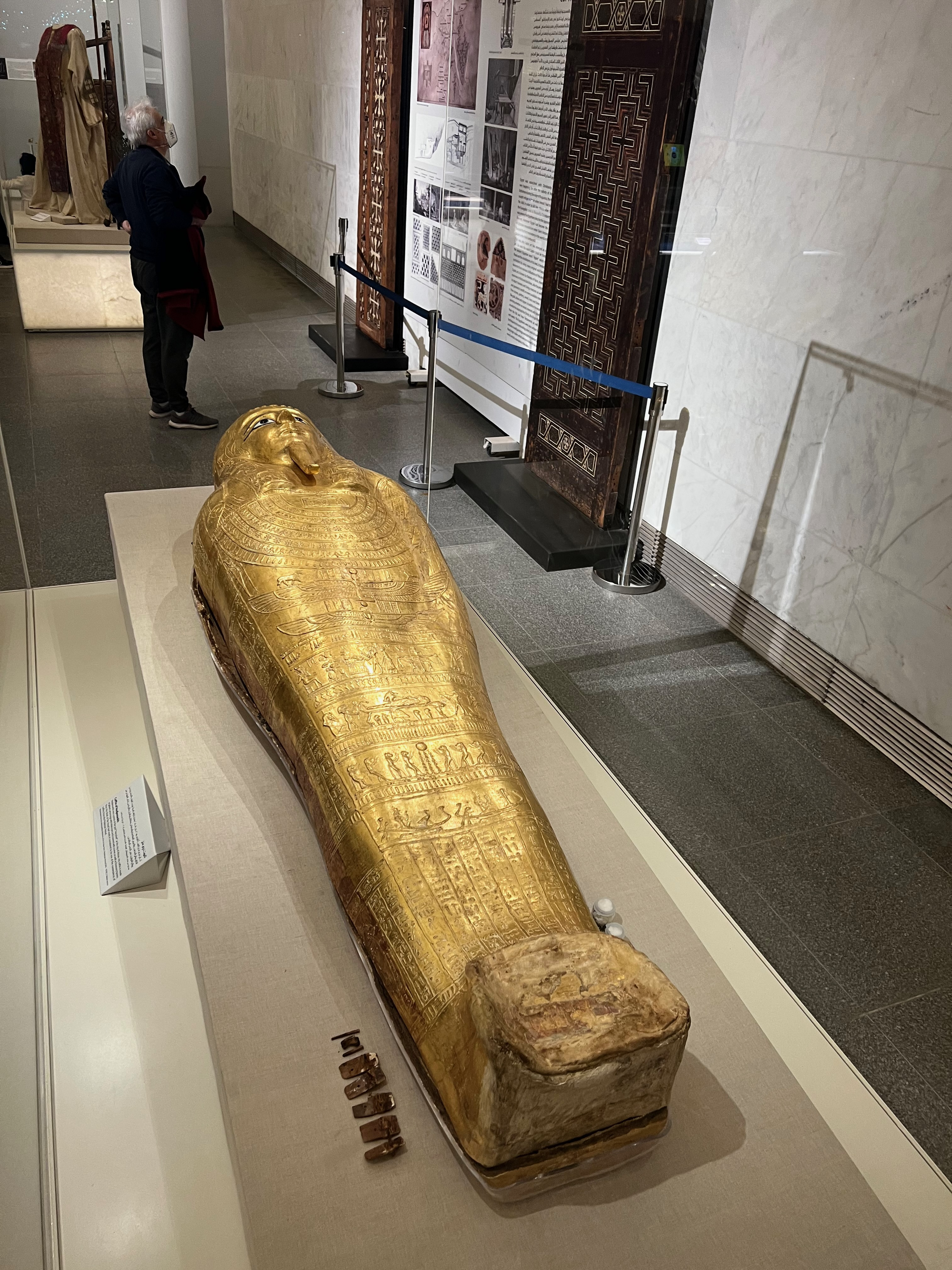
Coffin of Nedjemankh in the National Museum of Egyptian Civilization

In February 2019, the Metropolitan Museum was approached by the New York County District Attorney's Office, which presented the museum with evidence provided by the Egyptian government that the dealer's 1971 export license had been forged. Further evidence showed the coffin had been stolen in 2011 and its ownership history was fraudulent. On February 12 the museum then shuttered the then-ongoing exhibition Nedjemankh and His Gilded Coffin, previously scheduled to run through April 21, 2019. It then surrendered the coffin to the authorities, who handed it over to the Antiquities Repatriation Department of the Egyptian Ministry of Antiquities.

The coffin was unveiled on 1 October 2019 at the National Museum of Egyptian Civilization in Cairo.

== See also ==
- Archaeological looting
- Art of ancient Egypt

== Bibliography ==
- Macaulay-Lewis, Elizabeth (April 2021). "Making The Met, 1870–2020: A Universal Museum for the 21st Century". American Journal of Archaeology. 125 (5). Boston: Archaeological Institute of America: 319–330. doi:10.3764/aja.125.2.0319.
