= Heryshaf =

Ancient Egyptian deity

- Heryshaf
Name in hieroglyphs
Hr Z1 S Z1 N21 f
- Major cult center: Heracleopolis Magna

Equivalents
- Greek: Heracles; Dionysos

In Egyptian mythology, Heryshaf, or Hershef (Ancient Egyptian: ḥrj š f "He who is on His Lake"), transcribed in Greek as Harsaphes or Arsaphes (Koine Greek: Ἁρσαφής) was an ancient ram deity whose cult was centered in ancient Heracleopolis Magna. He was identified with Ra and Osiris in ancient Egyptian religion, as well as Dionysus or Heracles in the interpretatio graeca. The identification with Heracles may be related to the fact that in later times his name was sometimes reanalysed as ḥrj-šf.t "He who is over strength". One of his titles was "Ruler of the Riverbanks". Heryshaf was a creator and fertility god who was born from the primordial waters. He was pictured as a ram or a man with a ram's head.

== Temple at Heracleopolis Magna ==
The site goes back to the Early Dynastic Period or the Old Kingdom of Egypt. The precise founding date of Herakleopolis is not known, but an entry on the Palermo Stone reporting king Den's visit to the sacred lake of Heryshef at Nenj-neswt, suggests that the town had already been founded by the 1st Dynasty. The site was called nn-nswt in Demotic which was pronounced ǝhnes in Coptic, Heracleopolis (Magna) during the Hellenistic period and the Roman Empire and Ihnasiyya in Egyptian Arabic.

No remains of the Old Kingdom temple survive. Flinders Petrie found remains of a temple at the site dating to the Twelfth Dynasty. The Twelfth Dynasty temple was rebuilt during the Eighteenth Dynasty and later refurbished during the Nineteenth Dynasty. During the reign of Ramesses II, a pronaos was added to the temple. The sixteen palm columns used were taken from existing temples, possibly those of Djedkare Isesi or Sahure. Yasuoka speculates that Ramesses II's fourth son, Prince Khaemweset, may have been the official who directed this project.

== High Priests of Heryshaf ==
Many of these names are known from the Stela of Pasenhor.

- Nimlot C, son of pharaoh Osorkon II and his queen Djedmutesankh, Twenty-second Dynasty of Egypt
- Ptahudjankhef, son of Nimlot C and Tentsepeh C
- Hemptah A, son of Ptahudjankhef and Tentsepeh D
- Pasenhor A, son of Hemptah A and Tjankemit
- Hemptah B, son of Pasenhor A and Petpetdidies

Nedjemankh, whose coffin was looted from Egypt in 2011 and sold to the Metropolitan Museum of Art before being returned to Egypt in 2019, is also believed to have been a priest of Heryshaf.
