= Larnaca Salt Lake =

Lake network in Cyprus

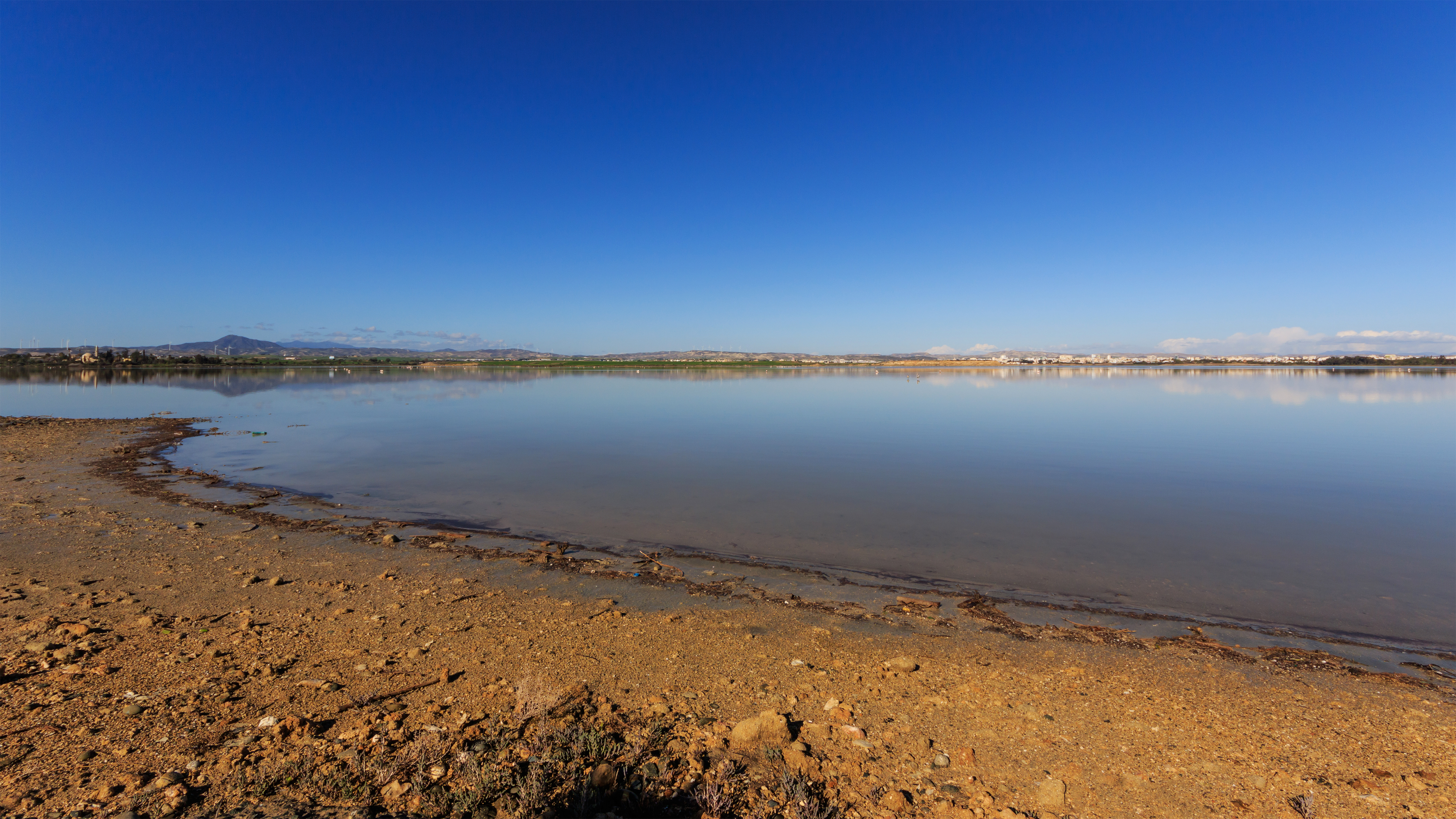
- in winter with part of Larnaca city in the background.

- Location within Cyprus
- Coordinates: 34°54′N 33°37′E
- Basin countries: Cyprus
- Surface area: 1,585 ha (3,920 acres)
- Average depth: 1 m (3 ft 3 in)
- Surface elevation: 0 m (0 ft)
- Settlements: Larnaca

Ramsar Wetland
- Designated: 11 July 2001
- Reference no.: 1081

Larnaca Salt Lake (Greek: Αλυκή Λάρνακας, romanized: Alykí Lárnakas, Turkish: Larnaka Tuz Gölü) is a complex network of four salt lakes (3 of them interconnected) of different sizes to the west of the city of Larnaca. The largest is lake Aliki, followed by lake Orphani, lake Soros and lake Spiro. They form the second largest salt lake in Cyprus after the Limassol Salt Lake. The total surface area of the lakes adds up to 2.2 km^{2} and being just off the road leading to Larnaca International Airport, the lake is one of the most distinctive landmarks of the area. It is considered one of the most important wetlands of Cyprus and it has been declared a Ramsar site, Natura 2000 site, Special Protected Area under the Barcelona Convention and an Important Bird Area (IBA). It is surrounded by halophytic scrubland and on its bank lies the Hala Sultan Tekke, one of the holiest of shrines within Ottoman Islam. It houses the tomb of Umm Haram, Muhammad's 'wet-nurse'.

Besides its picturesque beauty, the lake is the haunt of 85 species of water-birds with estimated populations between 20,000 and 38,000. It is one of the important migratory passages through Cyprus. Among the species are 2,000–12,000 flamingoes (Phoenicopterus roseus) which spend the winter months there feeding off populations of the brine shrimp Artemia salina. Other important bird species are Grus grus, Charadrius alexandrinus, Larus ridibundus, Himantopus himantopus, Burhinus oedicnemus, Hoplopterus spinosus, Oenanthe cypriaca and Sylvia melanothorax. Flocks of birdwatchers gather to observe the blaze of pink from flamingoes as they gather in the centre of the lake but also the other important migrants. The Larnaca Salt Lake complex was declared as a protected area by a decision of the Council of Ministers in 1997. Recent evidence suggests that contrary to previous belief the greater flamingo (Phoenicopterus roseus) not only stops over but also breeds on this wetland.

During the winter months the lake fills with water while in the summer the water evaporates, leaving a crust of salt and a haze of grey dust. According to legend, the lake's saltiness stems from St Lazarus' request to an old woman for food and drink. She refused, claiming her vines had dried up, to which Lazarus replied: "may your vines be dry and be a salt lake forever more." A more scientific explanation is that the salt water penetrates the porous rock between the lake and the sea, making the water very salty.

Salt harvested from this lake used to be one of the island's major exports, being collected with donkeys, carried to the edge of the lake, and piled up into huge pyramidal heaps. With rising labour costs harvesting dwindled to a negligible amount and stopped altogether in 1986 as the island now imports most of this commodity.

== Gallery ==
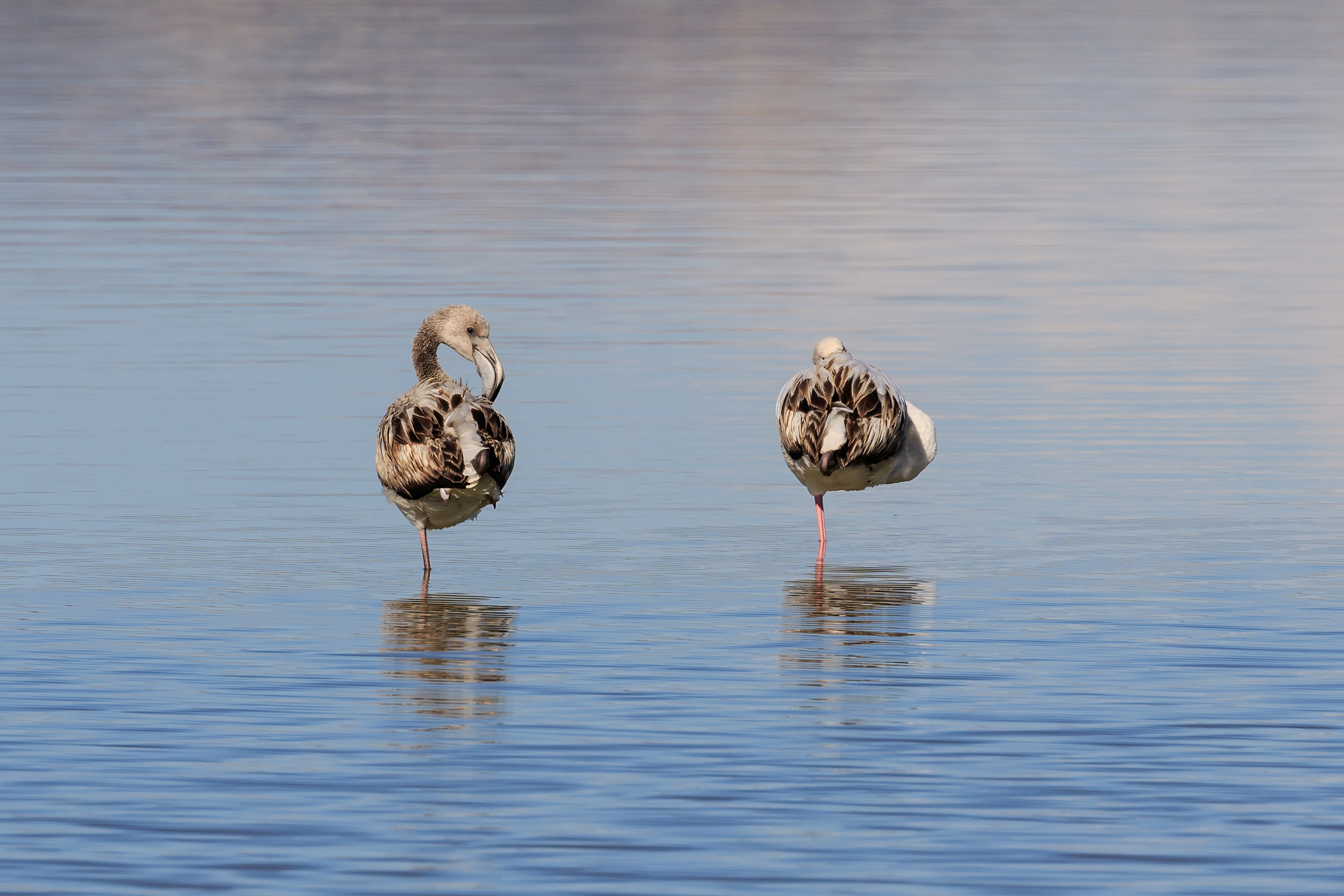
Flamingos on the lake

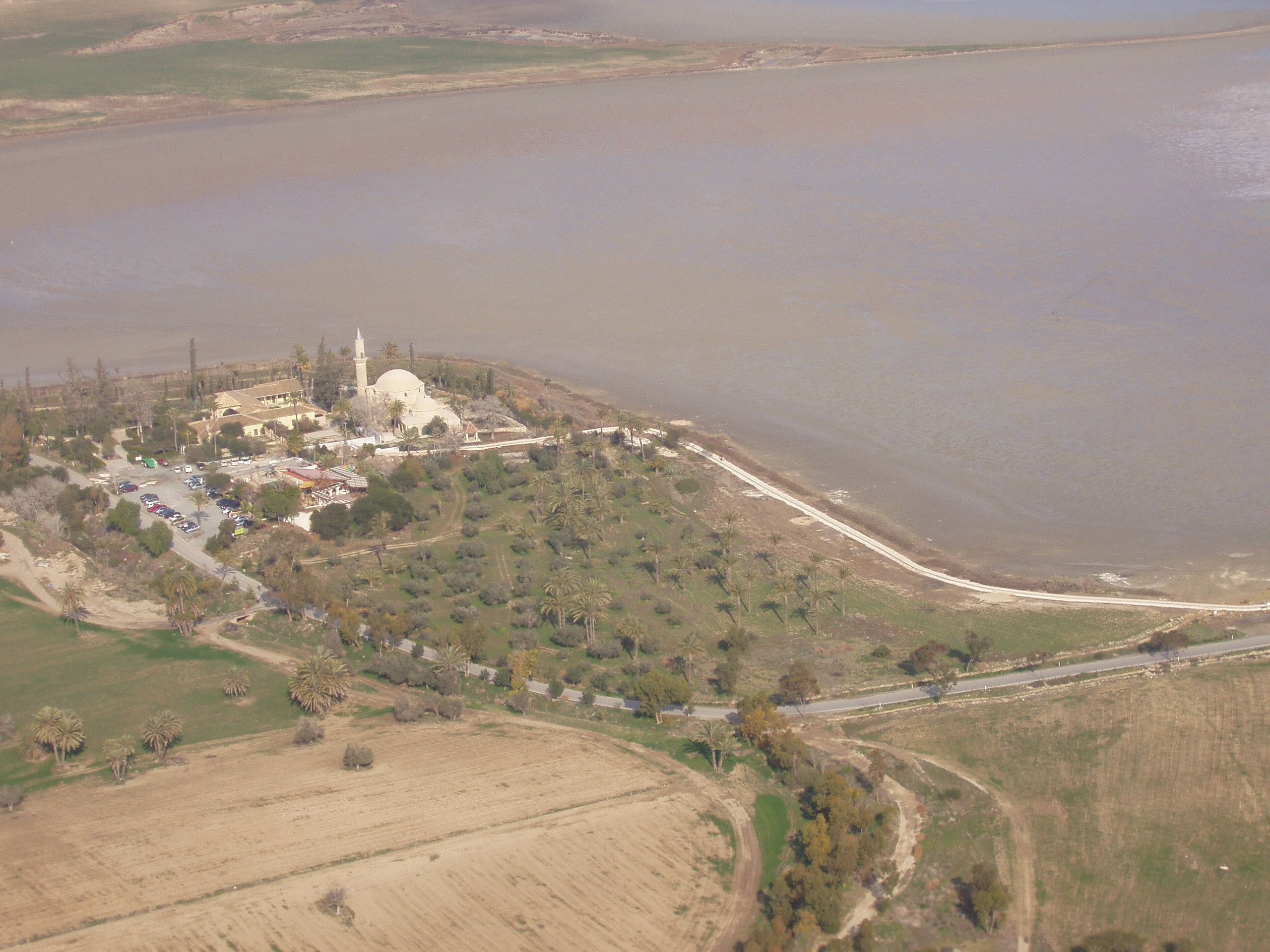
Aerial photo of the Larnaca Salt Lake (in winter) with Hala Sultan Tekke
