= Parlour =

Reception room

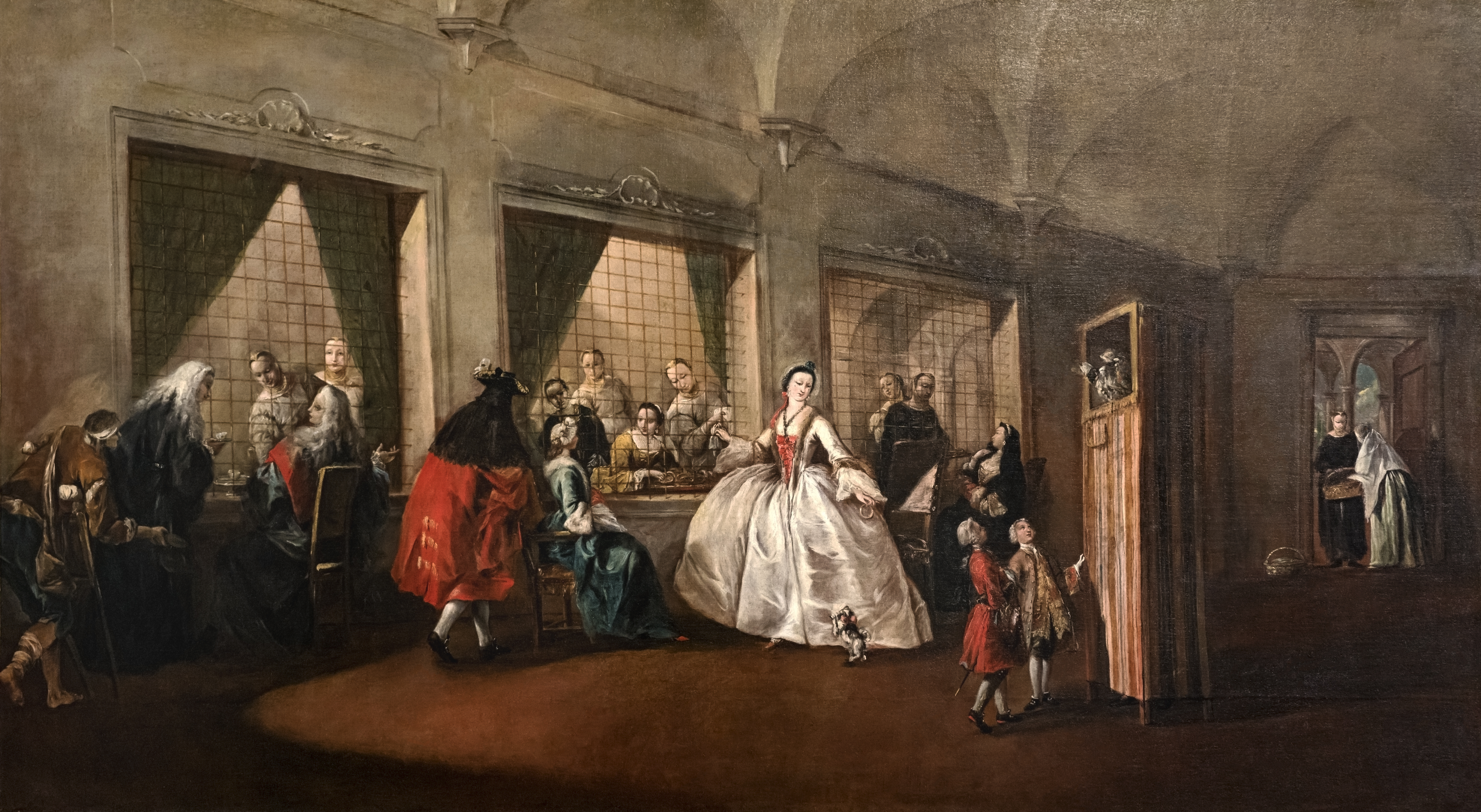
The Parlor of the Nuns at San Zaccaria, by Francesco Guardi, 1745–50

A parlour (or parlor) is a reception room or public space. In medieval Christian Europe, the "outer parlour" was the room where the monks or nuns conducted business with those outside the monastery and the "inner parlour" was used for necessary conversation between resident members. In the English-speaking world of the 18th and 19th century, having a parlour room was evidence of social status.

== Etymology ==
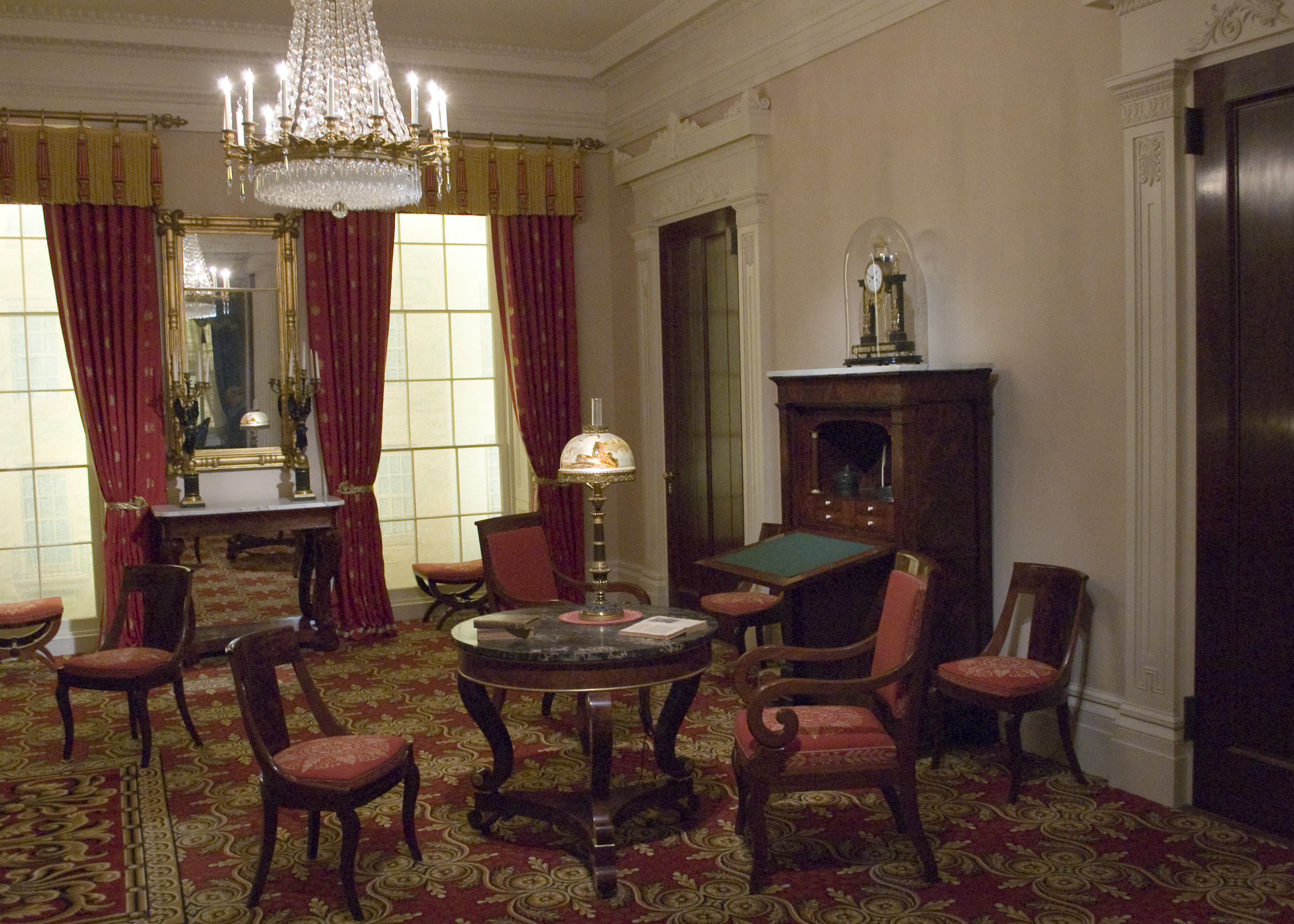
A Greek Revival parlour in the Metropolitan Museum of Art

In the early 13th century, parlour originally referred to a room where monks could go to talk, derived from the Old French word parloir or parler ("to speak"), it entered the English language around the turn of the 16th century.

== History ==
The first known use of the word to denote a room was in medieval Christian Europe, when it designated the two rooms in a monastery where clergy, constrained by vow or regulation from speaking otherwise in the cloister, were allowed to converse without disturbing their fellows. The "outer parlour" was the room where the monks or nuns conducted business with those outside the monastery. It was generally located in the west range of the buildings of the cloister, close to the main entrance. The "inner parlour" was located off the cloister next to the chapter house in the east range of the monastery and was used for necessary conversation between resident members.

It was the function of the "outer parlour" as the public antechamber of the monastery that was adapted into domestic architecture. In the early modern period homes became larger and concepts of privacy evolved as material prosperity was more widely shared. Rooms were increasingly set aside for the reception of guests and other visitors, screening them from the rest of the home. Although aristocratic homes might have state rooms, the frequent name for this reception room among the emerging middle classes (not likely to host state functions or royalty) was the "parlour".

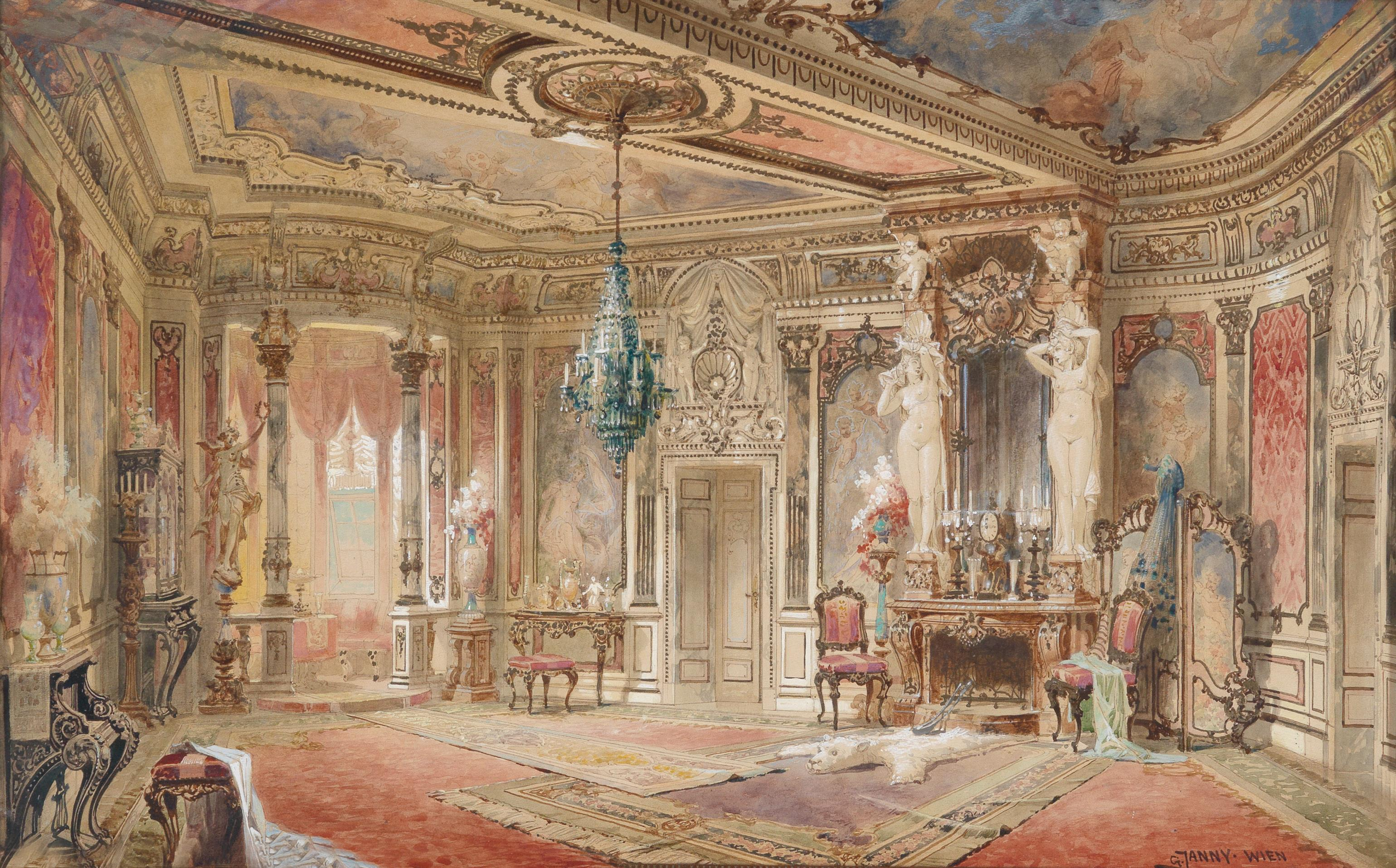
Makart-style parlour, by Georg Janny

In the English-speaking world of the 18th and 19th century, having a parlour room was evidence of social status. It was proof that one had risen above those who lived in one or two rooms. As the parlour was the room in which the larger world encountered the private sphere of middle class life (the family's face to the world) it was invariably the best room (it was often colloquially called that) in the home. The parlour frequently displayed a family's best furnishings, works of art and other status symbols.

Chamaedorea elegans, parlour palm, was one of several houseplants regularly grown in a parlour due to its ability to cope with low light and cooler temperatures.

The parlour was used for receptions on formal family occasions such as weddings, births and funerals. Some tradespeople used the parlour of their houses (or later houses bought specifically for business) in the service of their businesses. Hence, funeral parlours (for those who wished to lay out their deceased in a grander style than their own home), beauty parlours, and the like.

In the 20th century, the increasing use of the telephone and automobiles, as well as the increasing casualness of society, led to the decline of formal reception rooms in domestic architecture in English-speaking countries. The secondary functions of the parlour for entertaining and display were taken up by various kinds of sitting rooms, such as the living room in North American usage and the drawing room in British countries.

Despite its decline in domestic architecture, the term parlour continues to have an afterlife in its second meaning as nomenclature for various commercial enterprises. In addition to the above-mentioned funeral parlour and beauty parlour, it is also common to say betting parlour, billiard parlour, ice cream parlor, pizza parlour, massage parlour, tattoo parlour and cafe parlor. Less common uses include beer parlour, wine parlour, spaghetti parlour, and coffee parlour.

The dialect-specific usage of this English term instead of another (i.e., as opposed to "ice cream shoppe" or "pizzeria") varies by region.

== See also ==
- Family room
- Massage parlour
- Recreation room
- Haremlik
- Selamlık
