= Gynaeconomi =

Gynaeconomi (Greek: γυναικονόμοι) were magistrates at Athens, who superintended the conduct of Athenian women (Pollux, viii. 112). We know little of the duties of these officers, and even the time when they were instituted is not quite certain. Bockh (de Philoch. p. 24) has endeavoured to show that they did not exist until the time of Demetrius Phalereus, whereas, according to others, they were instituted by Solon, whose regulations concerning the female sex certainly rendered some special officers necessary for their maintenance (Plut. Sol. 21; comp. Thirl wall, Hist, of Greece, vol. ii. p. 51). Their name is also mentioned by Aristotle (Pol. iv. 12. p. 144, and vi. 5. p. 214. ed. Gottling) as something which he supposes to be well known to his readers. These circumstances lead us to think that the gynaeconomi as the superintendents of the conduct of women, existed ever since the time of Solon, but that their power was afterwards extended in such a manner that they became a kind of police for the purpose of preventing any excesses or indecencies, whether committed by men or by women (see the Fragm. of Timocles and Menander, ap. Athen. vi. p. 245, where a... is mentioned as the source from which they derived their increased power; compare Plut. Sol. 21. in fin). In their first and original capacity, therefore, they had to see that the regulations concerning the conduct of Athenian women were observed, and to punish any transgressions of them. In the latter capacity, they seem to have acted as ministers of the Areopagus, and as such had to take care that decency and moderation were observed in private as well as in public. Hence they superintended even the meetings of friends in their private houses, e. g. at weddings, and on other festive occasions (Philoch. ap. Athen, vi. p. 245). Meetings of this kind were not allowed to consist of more than thirty persons, and the gynaeconomi had the right to enter any house and send away all the guests above that number; and that they might be able, previous to entering a house, to form an estimate of the number of persons assembled in it, the cooks who were engaged for the occasion had to give in their names (Athen. I. c.).

The gynaeconomi also had the duty to punish men who showed their effeminate character by frantic or immoderate wailing at their own or other persons' misfortunes (Plut. Z. c.). The number of these officers is unknown. Meier (Ail. Proe. p. 97) thinks that they were appointed by lot but Hermann (Polit. Ant. § 150. n. 5), referring to Menander (Rket. de Encom. p. 105. ed. Heeren), reckons them among those officers who were elected.

== See also ==
- Gynaeconitis
