= Andron (architecture) =

Part of an ancient Greek house reserved for men

Andron (Greek: ἀνδρών, andrōn) or andronitis (ἀνδρωνῖτις, andrōnitis) is part of a Greek house that is reserved for men, as distinguished from the gynaeceum (γυναικεῖον, gynaikeion), the women's quarters. The andrōn was used for entertaining male guests. For this purpose the room held couches, usually an odd number to allow space for the door, tables which could be tucked under the couches, artwork and any other necessary paraphernalia. Not all classical Greek houses were large enough to have a dedicated andrōn, and even those that did might have used the room for mixed-gendered events and women receiving female guests, as well as men hosting symposia.

In excavations at Olynthus, rooms identified as andrōnes contained items identified with female activities, as in the rest of the house.

The definition of andrōn changed from Ancient Greek literature of Homer to the Latin of Vitruvius. Vitruvius explains some of the changes in Book 6 of De architectura; architectural theorist Simon Weir has explained the context around Vitruvius's comments.

Art historian Hallie Franks has explained the metaphors of movement in Greek andrōns.

== See also ==
- Man cave
- Selamlik
