= Haremlik =

Part of the house reserved for women

In pre-Atatürk Turkey, a haremlik was the private portion of upper-class Ottoman homes, as opposed to the selamlik, the public area or reception rooms, used only by men in traditional Islamic society. This contrasts with the common usage of harem as an English loan-word, which implies a female-only enclave or seraglio. Although the women of the household were traditionally secluded in the haremlik, both men and women of the immediate family lived and socialized there.

== Popular culture ==
Ann Bridge's Enchanter's Nightshade depicts Ottoman life in the period of Atatürk's rise to power, and makes clear the distinction in social usage in that period between the haremlik and selamlik.

== See also ==
- Gynaeceum, women’s quarters of similar function in Ancient Greece
- Andron, men's quarters of similar function in Ancient Greece
- Parlour
