= Egyptian Laws and Legislations Related to Conserving Cultural Heritage in Historic Cairo Area =

The conservation process for Cultural heritage in Egypt is subject to the following laws:

== Law no. 117 of 1983 ==
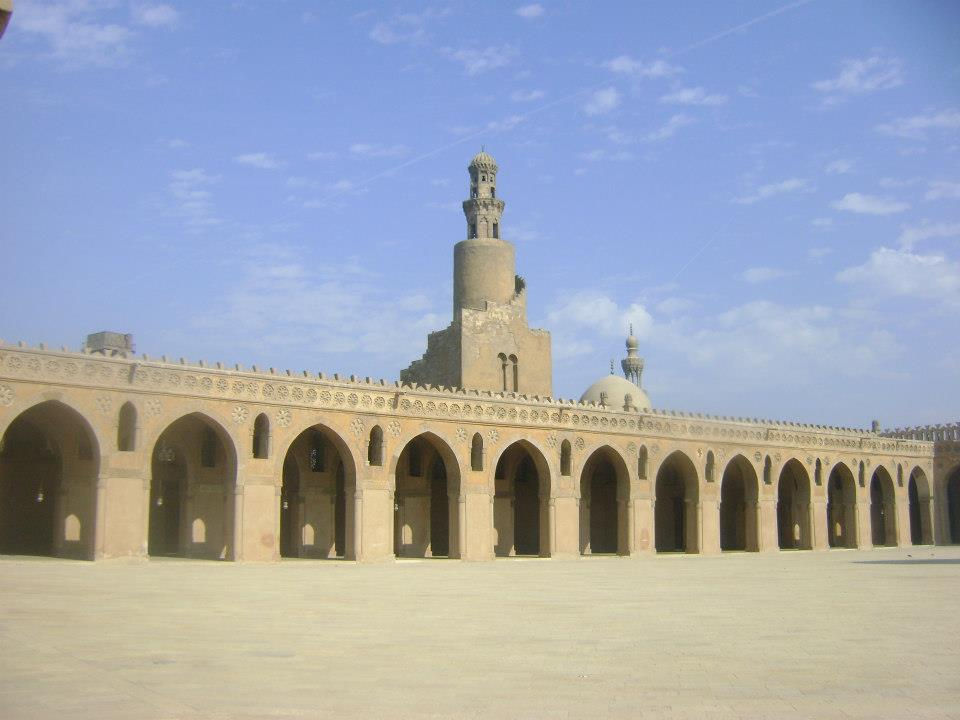
Mosque of Ibn Tulun in Cairo - Monument

It is "The law for protection of monuments". This law was updated in 2010 and the executive regulations were issued in the same year. This law was the only enforced law in the field of heritage conservation until law no.144 of 2006 and its executive regulations issued with.

This law includes “Artifacts produced by different cultures or caused by arts, sciences, literature or religion of the pre historic era and during consecutive historic periods till a hundred years ago when it held value or had archaeological or historic importance is considered one of the manifestation of different cultures”

== Law no.144 of 2006 ==
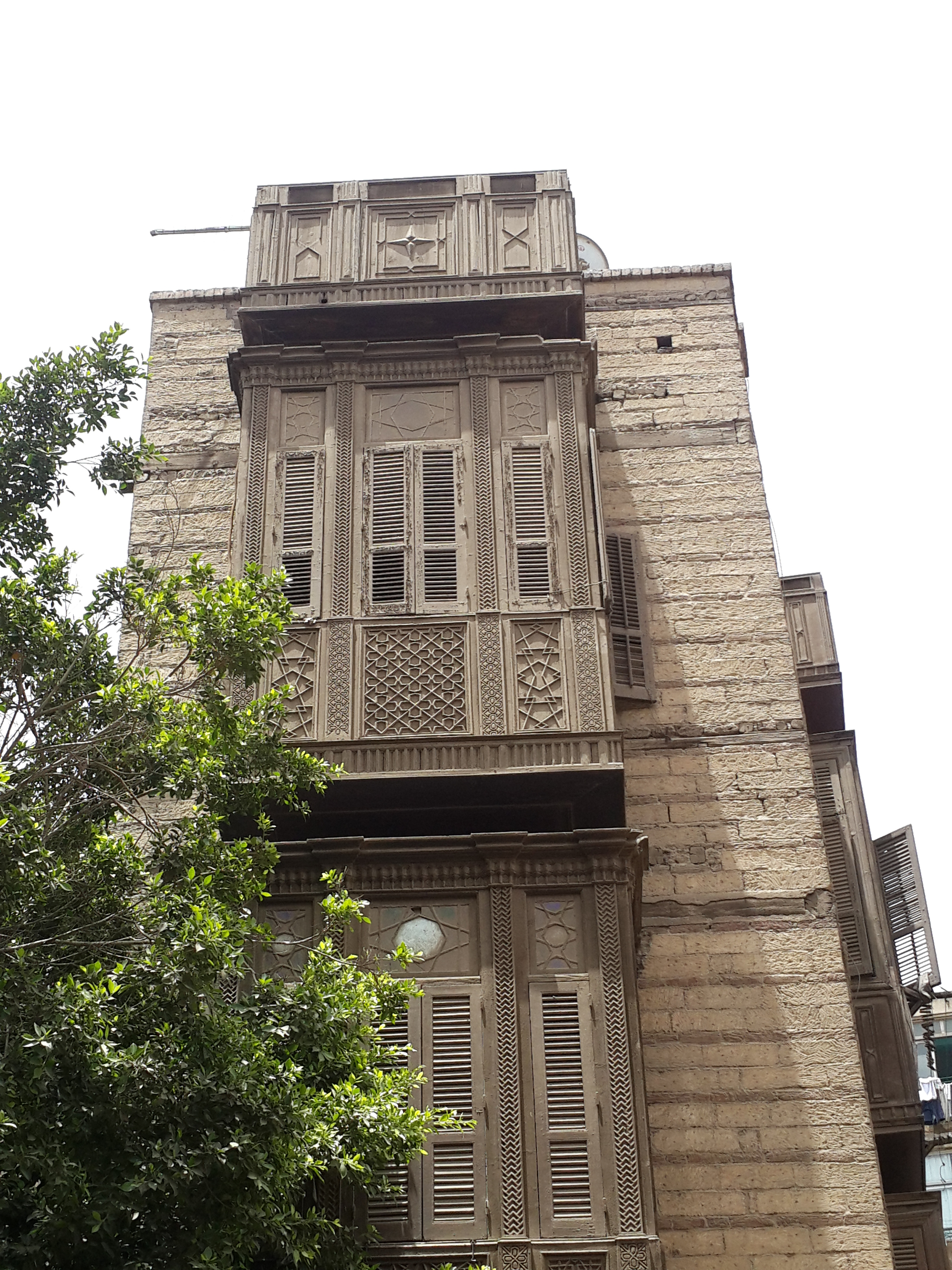
Abu-Al Hassan House - 19th century houses - Distinctive value building

It is about conserving architectural heritage. This law was concerned of protecting the buildings of distinctive value and buildings of high heritage value.

This law includes “Buildings and structures of distinctive architectural order or related to national history or a historic personality or those representing a historic era or considered a touristic destination; those are protected against demolition or modification”

== Law no. 119 of 2008 ==
It is called "Urban Harmony". This law and its executive regulations are responsible for conserving areas of distinctive value for their architectural and urban characters as well as buildings and other natural elements.

This law includes "The areas characterized by richness of contents of heritage, architectural, physical symbolic, aesthetic or natural value; and need to be dealt with as an integrated unit for conservation"

It is different from the above-mentioned laws in terms of the area of application where this law is concerned about the urban area and the monument context not the monument building itself. It defines the monument frontiers, boundaries and its buffer zone. So, this law work as a complementary law for conserving the whole context in an integrated way.

== See also ==
- Residential Architecture in Historic Cairo
