= Selamlık =

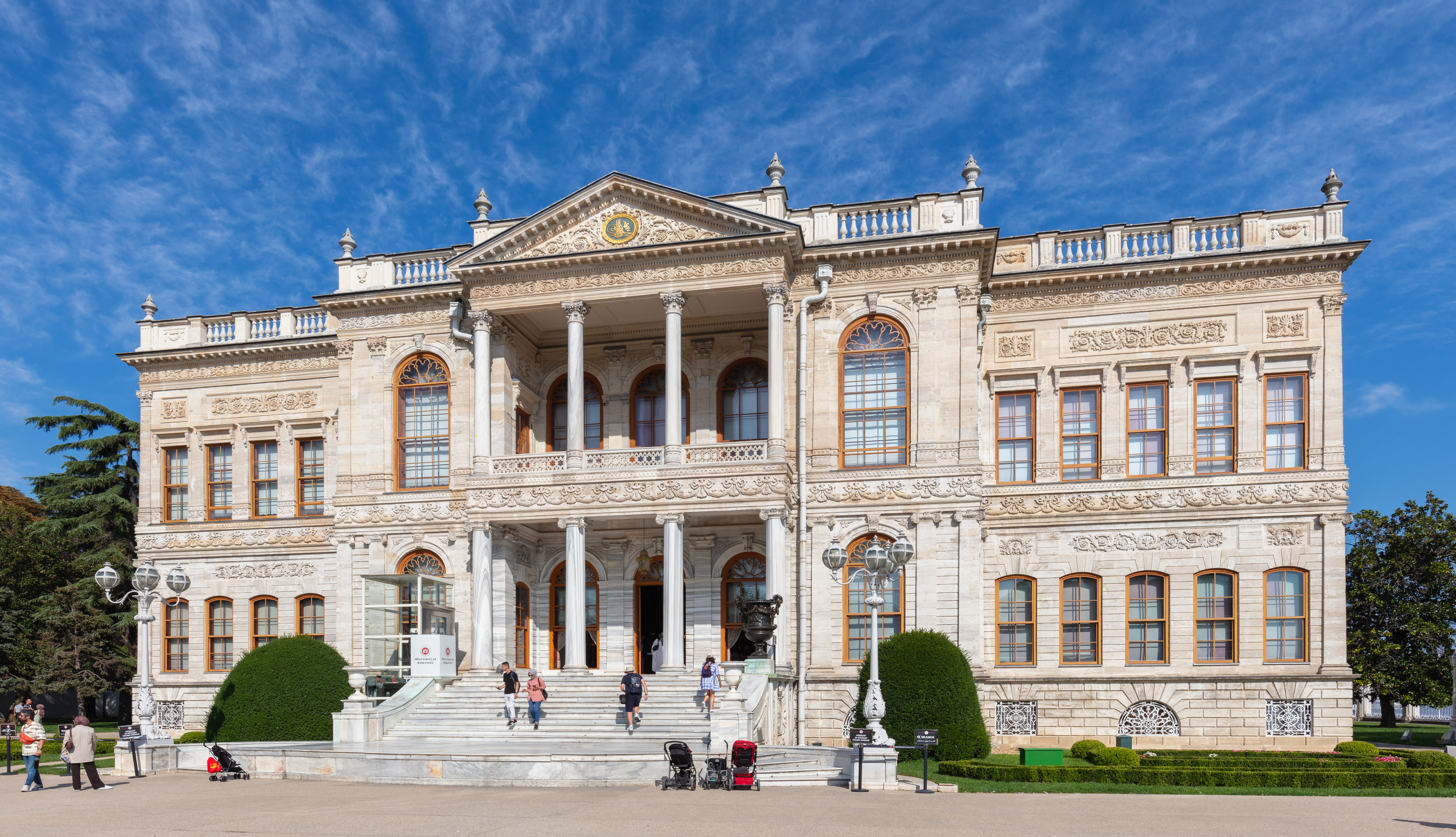
Outside view of the Selamlık of Dolmabahçe Palace

The Selamlik, Selamluk or Sélamlique (Ottoman Turkish: سلاملق, Turkish: Selamlık) was the portion of an Ottoman palace or house reserved for men. It was also the portion of the household where guests might be received and entertained, similar to the andron or andronites (courtyard of men) in ancient Greece. This function gave the area its name from the root word selam ("greeting"). By contrast, the haremlik or women's quarters, similar to the ancient Greek gynaeceum, were reserved only for the family.

== See also ==
- Haremlik
- Odalisque
- Parlour

== Sources and references ==
- Dictionary.com - Selamlik entry
