= Gynaeceum =

Portion of a house reserved for women in Ancient Greece

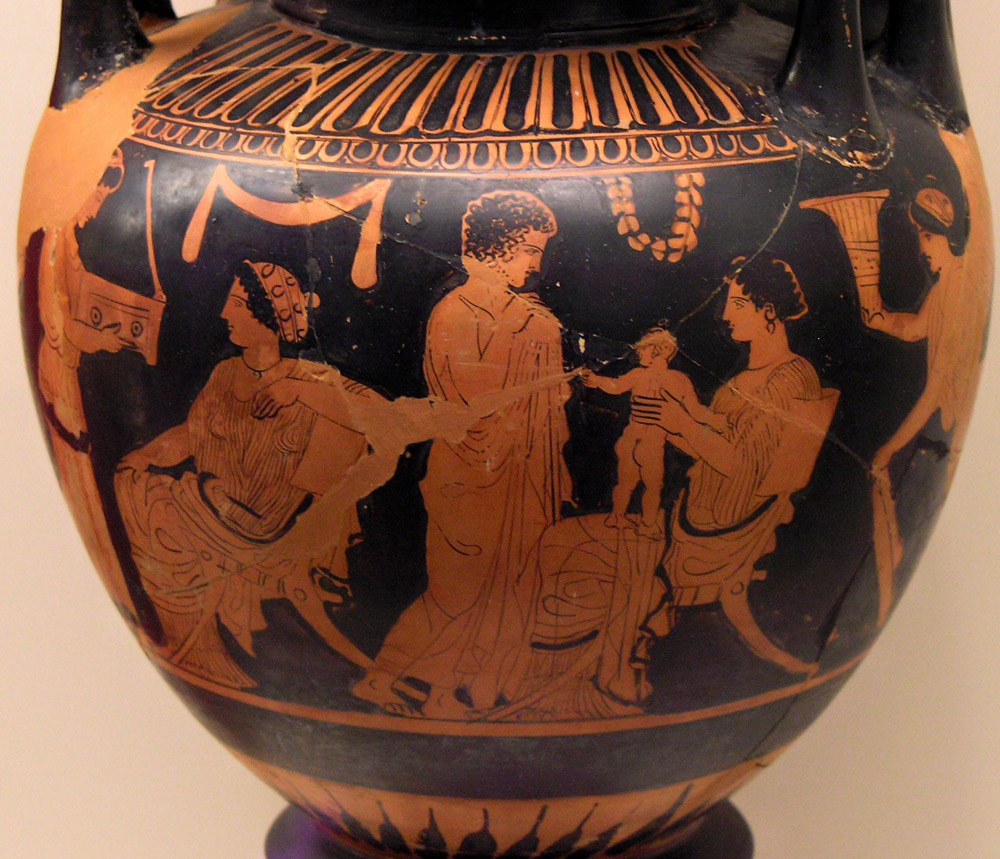
Family scene in a gynaeceum – painted on a lèbes gamikòs about 430 BC

In Ancient Greece, the gynaeceum (Greek: γυναικεῖον, gynaikeion, from Ancient Greek γυναικεία, gynaikeia: "part of the house reserved for the women"; literally "of or belonging to women, feminine") or the gynaeconitis (γυναικωνῖτις, gynaikōnitis: "women's apartments in a house") was a building or the portion of a house reserved for women, generally the innermost apartment. In other words, a women's quarters, similar to the South Asian antahpura and Islamic South Asian zenana. The gynaeceum is the counterpart to the andrōn, or male quarters.

The married woman of the household would often join the unmarried women and the female slaves at night when she did not join her husband. The women spent most of their days in this area of the house. These rooms were more remote from those reserved for the men by placing them away from the streets and public areas of the house. When visitors were entertained the women were not present, but remained in this secluded portion of the house.

A section of the imperial palace of Constantinople during the Greek Byzantine Empire reign was known as the gynaikonitis and was reserved to women. It had its own ceremonial rites and processions as well as political dynamics.

== Women in Greek antiquity ==
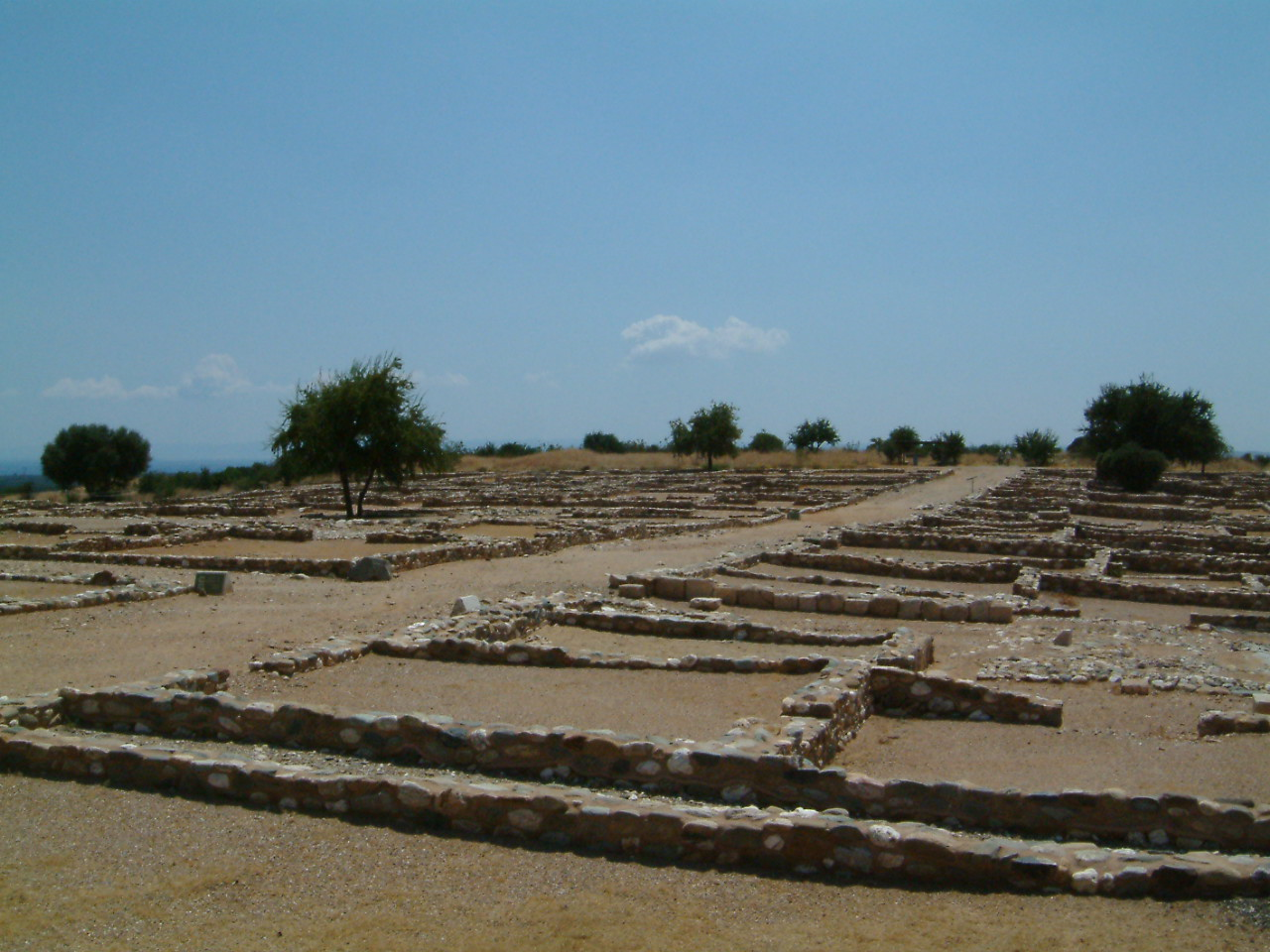
Reconstructed remains of the ancient city of Olynthus

In sorting through the remnants of residential architectural complexes found in sites such as Zagora and Olynthus, archeologists have been able to explore the social dynamics of Ancient Greek society as it developed into the polis or city-state. Archeologists have developed various perspectives on how architectural design was fundamentally utilized in the domination of women and the lower classes through various periods of history. The segregation of women from the public sphere through the addition of doors, limits of sight lines in between rooms, the addition of a courtyard, and even the addition of a second floor parallels the gradual evolution of the city-state.

Some would argue that the presence of women in the public sphere increased at a certain point through changes to dress and the increased use of the veil. The veil is seen by some researchers as an extension of the home and functions to protect women from the view of non-kin males. The domination of women through social conventions are evident in existing historical record, such as the enforcement of the use of the veil, the creation of guardians of women, and limits to movement within and outside of the home.

The archeological record provides a limited perception of the realities of women, as much of the record has been lost to the centuries.

== From andron to gynaeceum ==
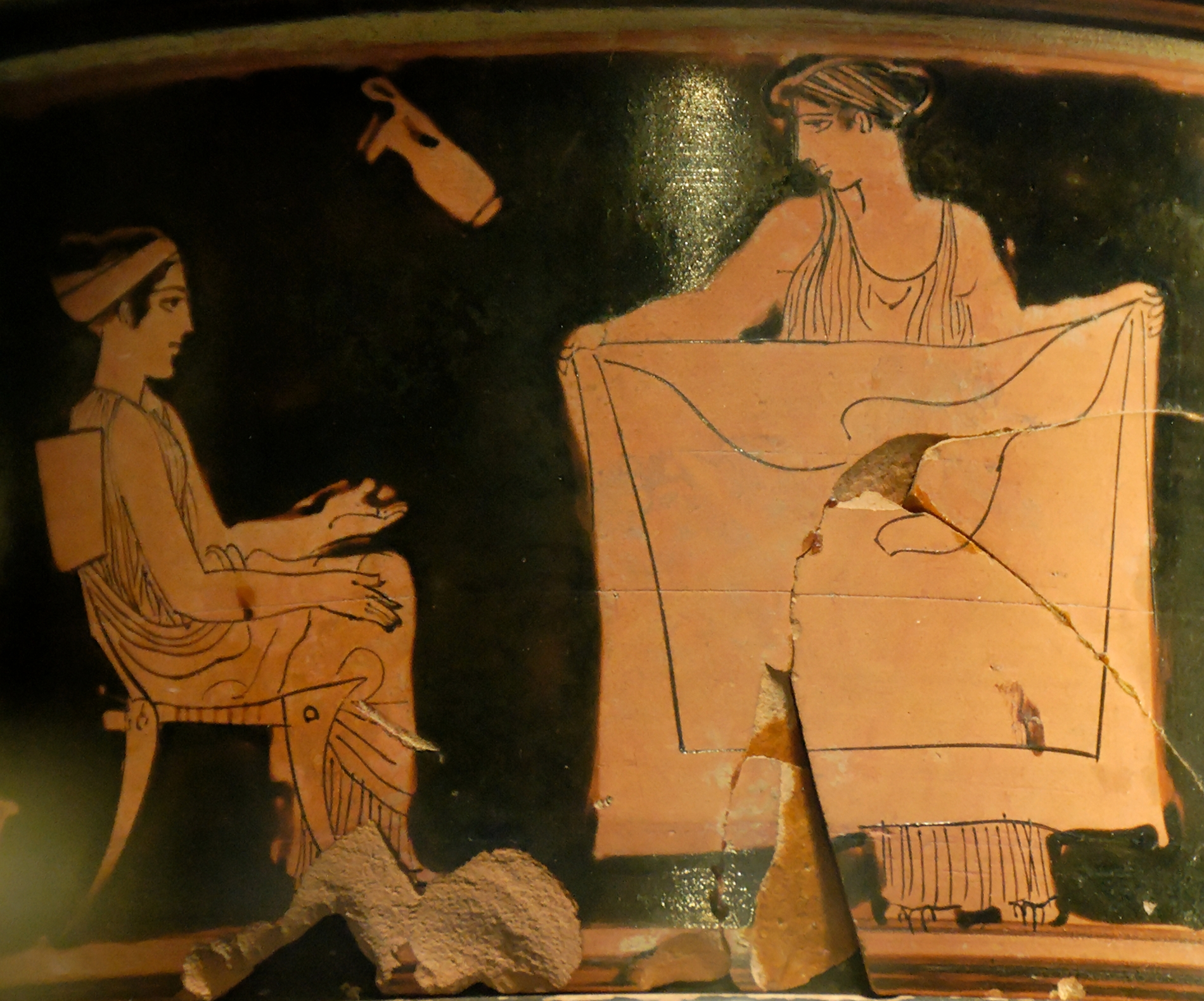
Painting on a pyxis showing a gynaeceum scene, about 430 BC

Free-born male citizens held political, social and economic power within the domestic and public sphere, as evidenced by the vast amount of historical records available regarding inheritance, property rights, and trade agreements. Ancient law books and surviving artwork reveal inheritance and property rights favoring male kin and even male non-kin over the women of the household. The practice of exposing new born female babies revealed a society that favored the male sex. The creation of specific rooms in the house designated for male-only socialization appeared at a certain point in the Classical Greek period. The practice of holding symposium, within the andrōn for the possible purpose of arranging economic agreements within the male aristocratic community, is alluded to in many ceramic vases and murals. It is in sifting through these surviving remnants of the domestic sphere that archeologists have been able to piece together an understanding of women's social, economic, and political realities.

== Archaeological and textual evidence ==
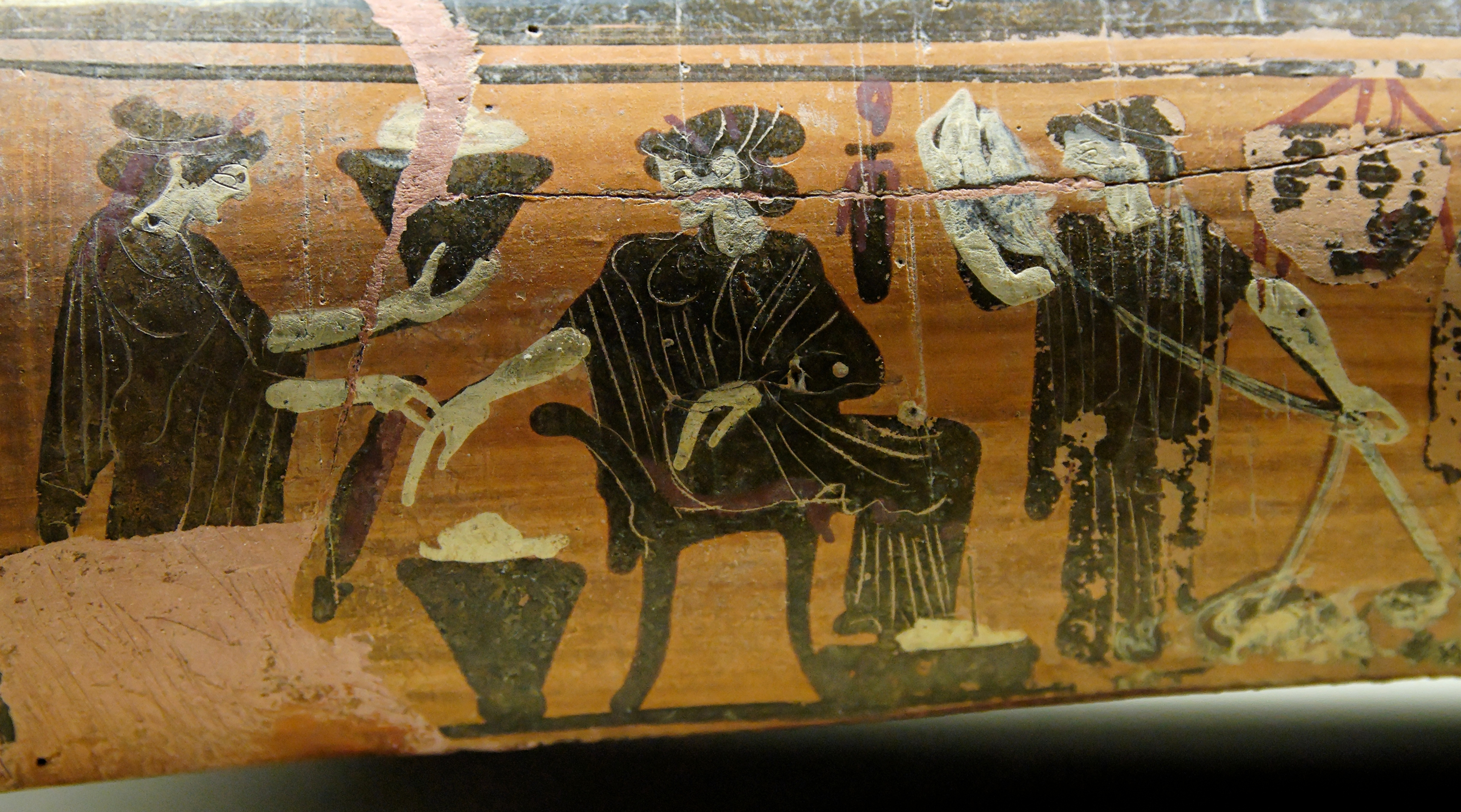
Detail from an epinetron showing women weaving in a gynaeceum, about 500 BC

Artistic references may shed some light on the religious, cultural, and economic activities of the aristocratic elements of society. Key to research into the status of women has been the archeological evidence found or implied within the excavated residential structures. Artifacts such as ceramic vases, looms, cups, and metal hinges found within the excavated sites suggest social, cultural, and economic clues. Looms and olive presses located within the residential excavation zones further suggest the economic role of women within the home. Textual evidence proves the production of textiles and the role that men played in the trade of such products, while women and their slaves created the products to be traded and sold. The writings of Xenophon express Socrates' perception of the role of aristocratic women as that of weaving and managing the slaves of the household, while the men having citizenship rights can move freely in the public sphere. Other social norms found through popularized literature include the idea that the whiteness of the skin of women proved their status. Slaves and prostitutes had access to the areas of the public and privates spheres and often labored outdoors.

Segregation of the sexes within the household proved very important to the maintenance of the home which was the economic foundation of the city-state, through its production of marketable goods. The culture of surveillance seemed to be evident through the changes of shape of the household, to a radial shape which allowed for better viewing, and the use of symposium in the andrōn. Cups found in rooms identified as the andrōn also contained other artifacts like remnants of a wooden bench, also prove similar to the painted depictions of symposium found on the ceramic vases. The metal hinges and indentations on structures that could be said to be load bearing suggest the partitioning of space for possible private functions that required limited view by members of the household. Archeologists have discussed the possibility of religious acts taking place within the home prior to the creation of temples, these religious acts were usually conducted by women of certain status in the communities.

== From single room to multiple rooms ==
The megaron, the great hall of the Grecian palace complexes, was a single room structure built around a courtyard and expanded to include multiple rooms.

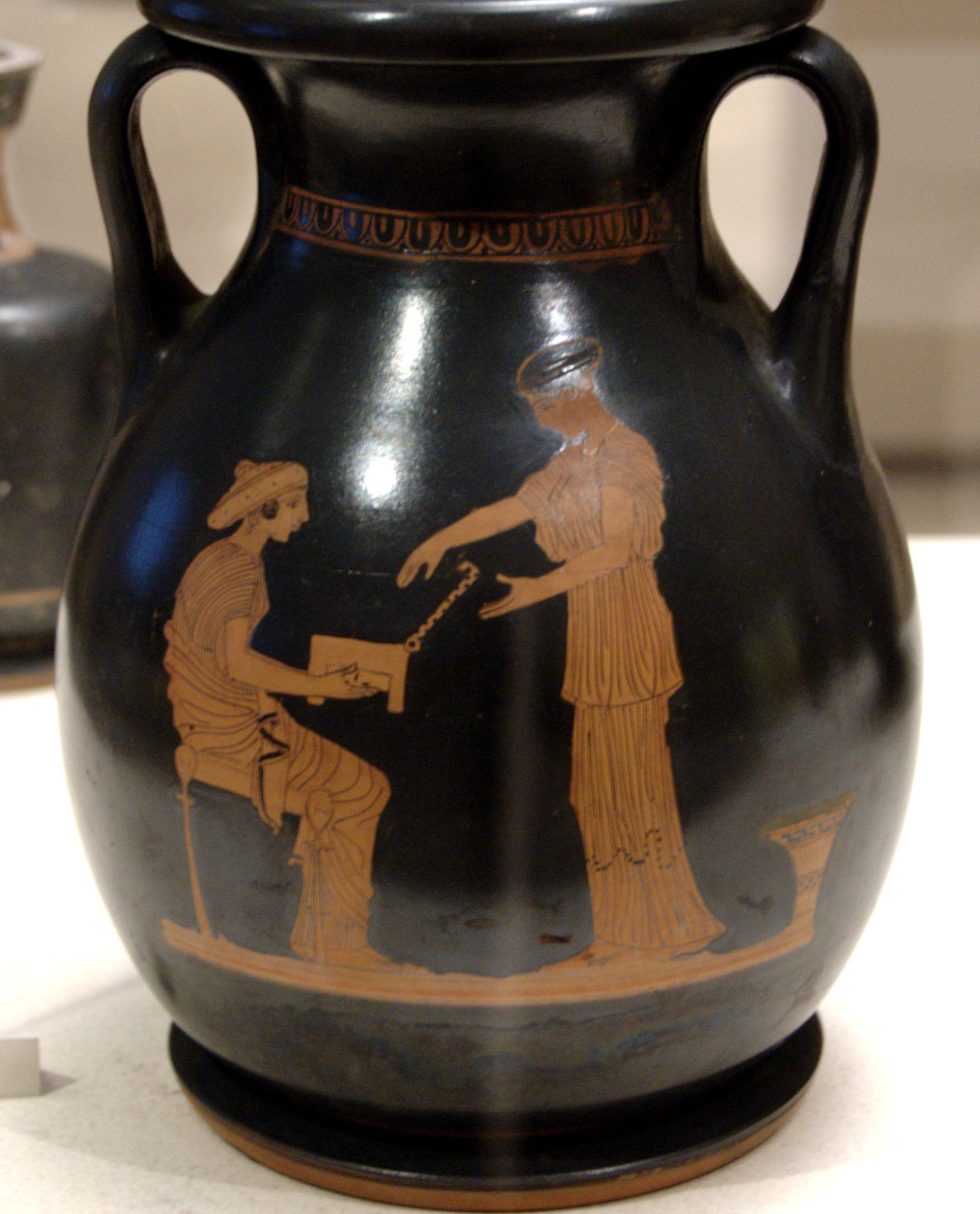
Pelike showing a gynaeceum scene, 440–430 BC

Dominant in the discourse is the notion of public and private spheres evolving in tandem with the changes to the architectural designs of the home, which suggest the idea of the use of space in facilitating social conditioning in order to maintain social, cultural, political norms. The layout and design of the residential structures hint at the functionality of the space and the social and cultural norms that may or may not have been in place. Changes to the architectural designs of the residential sites suggest the influence of political and social changes. The megaron, single room structure, expanded in size to fit multiple rooms with a courtyard in the middle, and some to include a second floor. The sightlines or the lack of lines of sight also provide a certain amount of privacy between rooms within the home. The addition of a courtyard with a single entrance to the outside also allowed for further privacy for the household and limiting access from those considered outside of kin relationship. The new structure allowed members of the household to control the right of passage through the use of partitions such as curtains and doors, some with locks. Some excavated sites revealed, however, that some multi-room residences were designed in such a way that each room connected to the other, suggesting that in order for someone to go to another room, they had to pass through a room and possibly be unable to avoid interaction with other members of the household. The use of an ante room next to the andron alludes to the use of social conventions in controlling the movement between rooms and the possibility of interaction between members of the household.

Research suggests that the increase in size of residential structures paralleled the increase in wealth and further entrenchment of the aristocratic elite in that period. The possible purpose for this gradual change of architectural design is seen by many as that of maintaining the social and hierarchal norms of the oikos and the polis. In these large residences, the symposium and the andrōn became spaces within the home that which men performed and displayed citizenship and maintenance of the polis. Women of a certain class were segregated from participation in symposium and various other areas of society and were regulated within the gynaeceum. It is in finding the andrōn and the evidence of symposium that one is able to determine the location of the gynaeceum, or women's quarters.

== Gynaikonomoi ==
Much of the information that is known of women in Ancient Greece comes through literary sources as the written word grew in use during the Classical and Hellenic period, such as Homer's Iliad and the Odyssey and through the writings of Euripides, Xenophon, and Aristotle. Through textual analysis, one can see early philosophical perceptions of women as being the foundation on which justifications for the domination of women during the formation of the city-state. Women were considered the weaker gender and therefore needed to be controlled. The control of women both within the home and in the public sphere became an important function of the growing city-states and lead to the eventual adoption of guardians of women also known as gynaikonomoi. Certain laws gave freedom of movement to freed slaves if they gave birth to four children and freeborn women could go without a guardian if they gave birth to three or more children. The Laws of Draco (lawgiver) brought forth punishment of women for adultery, and justified the need for guardianship due to the supposed weakness of gender expressed through Aristotle's popular literature. The written word as it became popularized in its use also functioned as a tool of domination of women, through the formation of laws and judiciary systems. The hereditary ownership of property once a mother's role transferred to later the next male kin and even non-kin males. The home became the domestic private sphere in which women's virtue needed to be protected from the outside world of male dominance and rational thought. Sarah Pomeroy discusses the role of Homer, Hesiodic poems, and Aristotelian philosophy in painting the picture of women as reproducers of wealth through the maintenance of the home and slaves. The separation of the sexes of household slaves became an important role of aristocratic women, as it prevented the birth of new slaves at the cost of the household.

== Interpreting the evidence ==
Archeologists have had to look further into other areas of knowledge, like social history, to further understand women's participation and segregation in Ancient Greek societies. Recent investigation of large archeological complexes, such as in Olynthos and Zagora, have opened up further avenues for analysis. According to Sarah Pomeroy, archeologists of the past have been guilty of many biases that have limited the research and understanding of women in antiquity. The bias of repeating the past research, as well as using the "fill in the gaps" style of interpretation when there is a lack of archeological evidence, can be problematic. However, others suggest cross cultural analysis into the political, social, and economic avenues of society to fill in the missing information.

== See also ==
- Women in ancient Sparta
- Women in Classical Athens
