= Thanjavur Maratha Palace =

Palace in Thanjavur, Tamil Nadu, India

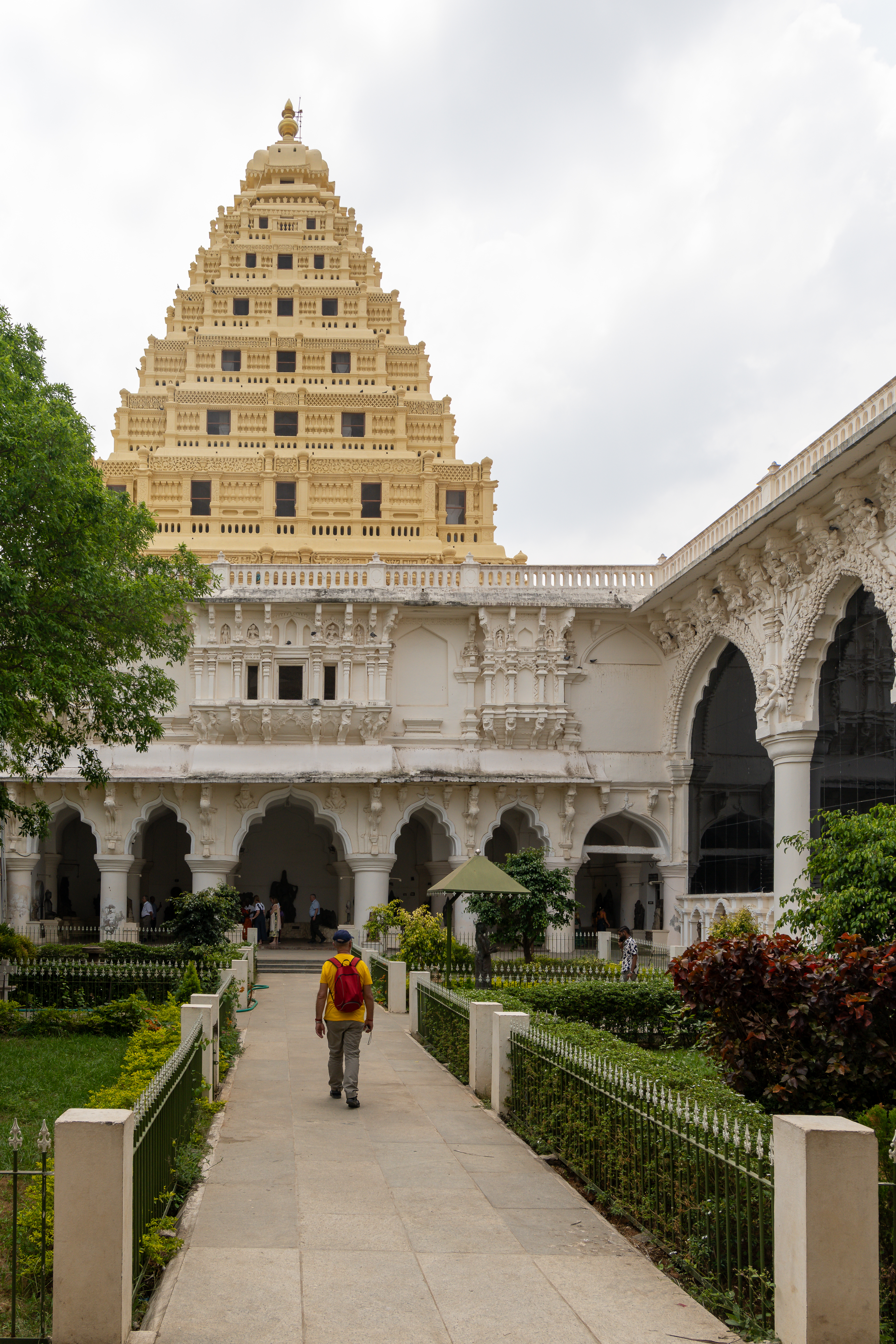
- Thanjavur Maratha Palace Complex

General information
- Architectural style: Vijayanagara architecture (Tamil Country style), Tanjorean architecture (Maratha Raj)
- Location: Thanjavur, Tanjore region, India

The Thanjavur Maratha Palace, known locally as Aranmanai (« the Palace » in Tamil), is the official residence of the Bhonsle family that ruled Tanjore from 1674 to 1855. Located at the heart of the historical city of Thanjavur, Tamil Nadu, this palace has served as the residence of the successive rulers of the kingdom from at least the 16th century.

== History ==
The Thanjavur Maratha palace was originally constructed by the Nayaks of the Thanjavur Nayak kingdom. After the fall of the Nayak dynasty, it served as the official residence of the Thanjavur Marathas. When most of the Thanjavur Maratha kingdom was annexed by the British Empire in 1799, the Thanjavur Marathas continued to hold sway over the palace and the surrounding fort or walled city. The Bhonsle family was rendered heirless under the doctrine of lapse following the death of the last king of Thanjavur in 1855, Shivaji II. The East India Company subsequently took control of the Tanjore state properties and of the Raja's private estate and other assets, including the palace. However, following legal actions brought by members of the royal family, together with disagreements within the colonial administration over the treatment of the former royal estate, the Bhonsle family eventually retained possession of the palace and recovered part of its remaining property.

== Constituents ==
The palace complex consists of the Sadar Mahal Palace, the queen's courtyard and the Durbar Hall. The Royal Palace Museum contains a splendid collection of Chola bronzes. The Raja Serfoji Memorial Hall and the Royal Palace Museum are situated in the Sadar Mahal Palace. There is also a small bell tower. The Saraswathi Mahal Library is situated with the Thanjavur palace complex. The Chandramouleeswarar temple also is located within the premises.

== Gallery ==
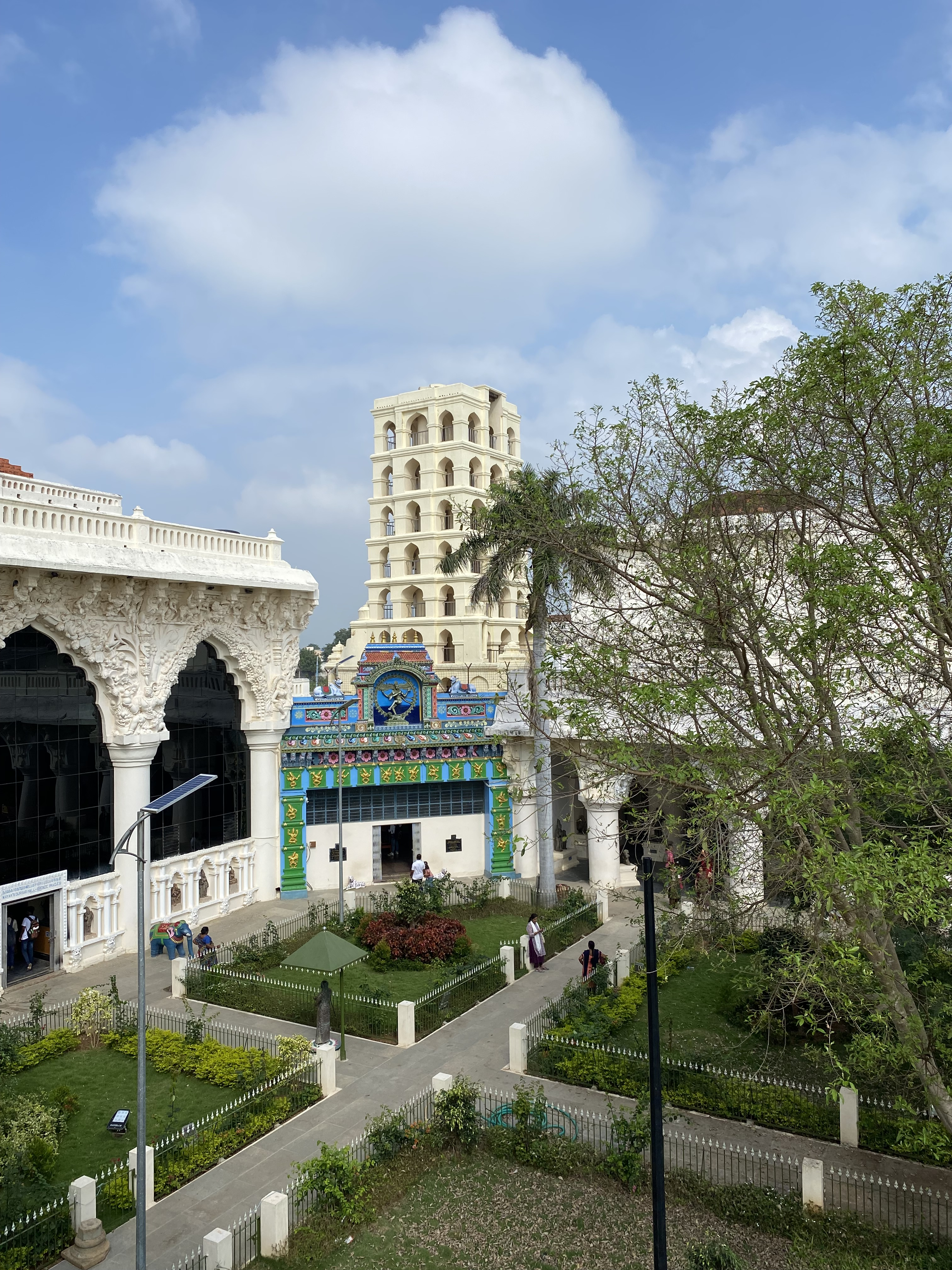
Thanjavur Maratha palace, 2023

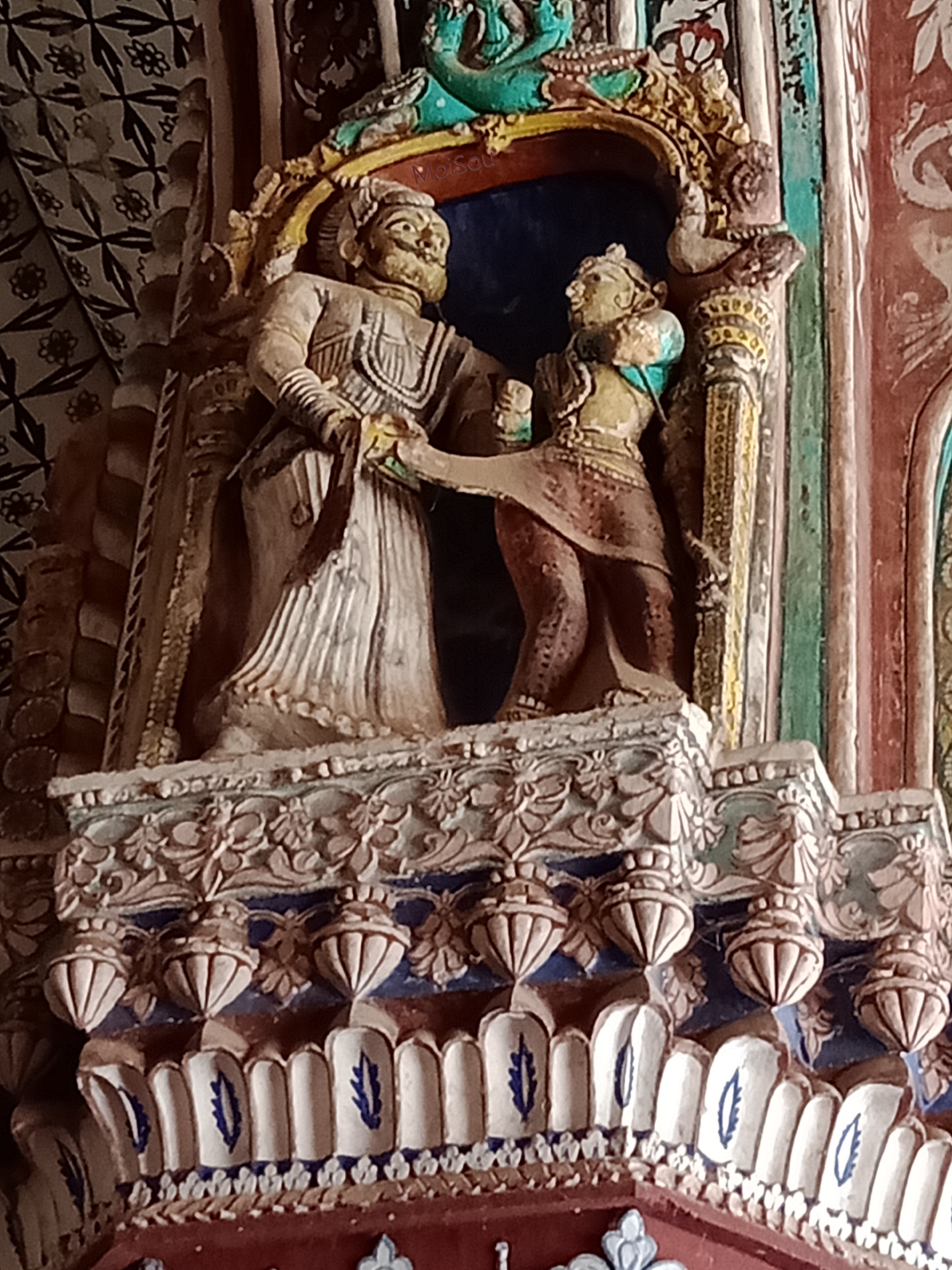
Palace Pillar l

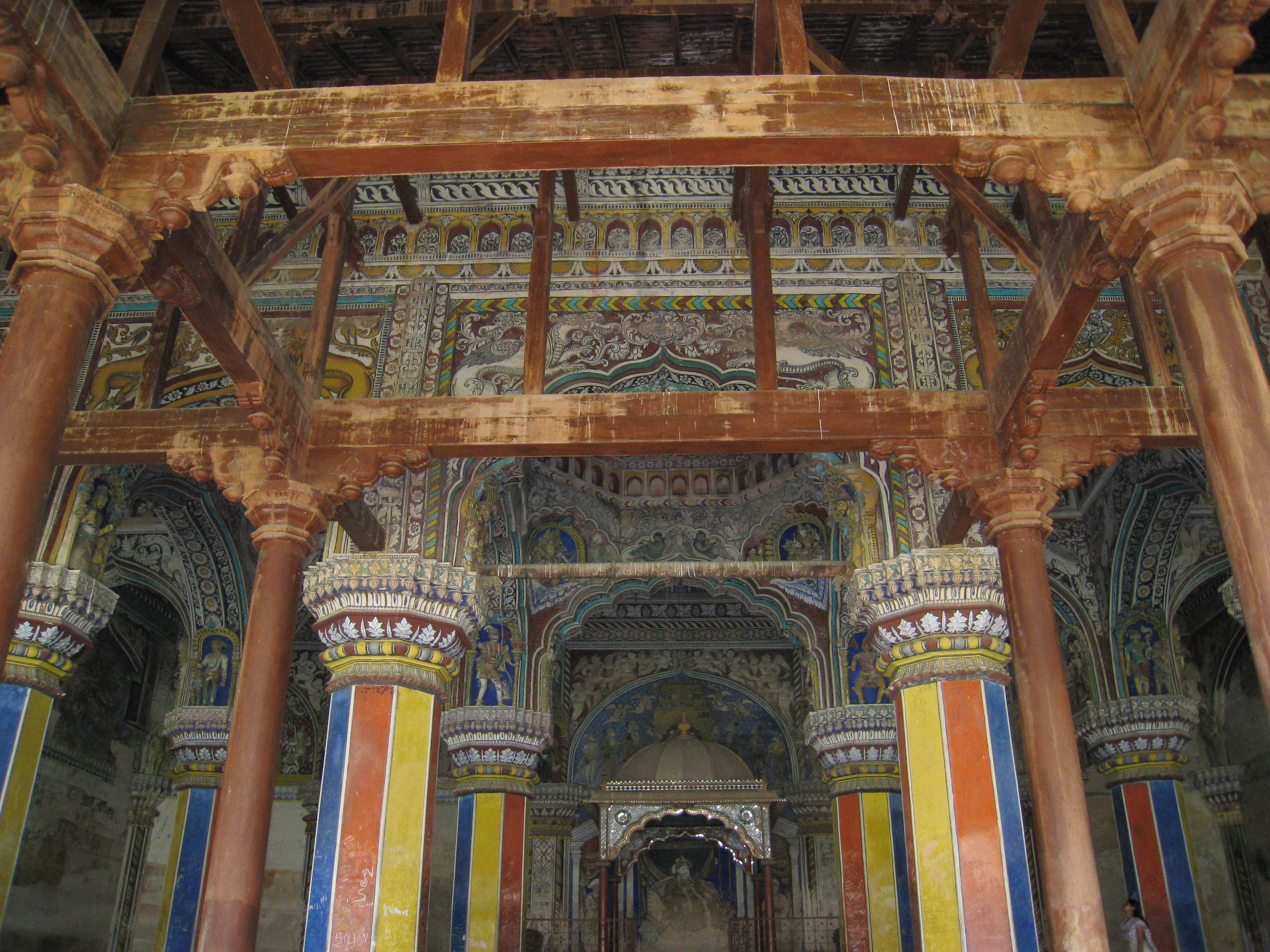
Thanjavur Palace Interior

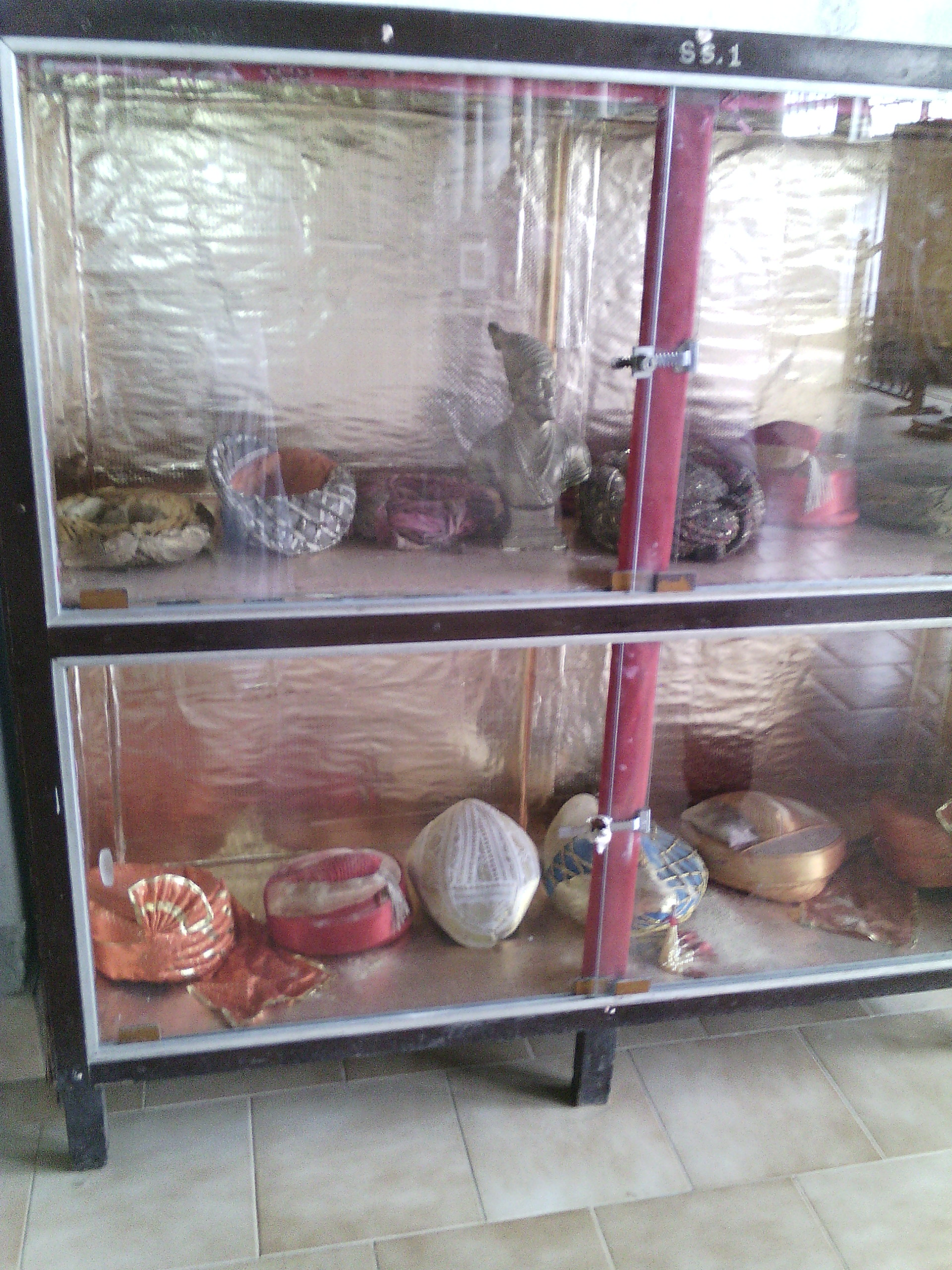

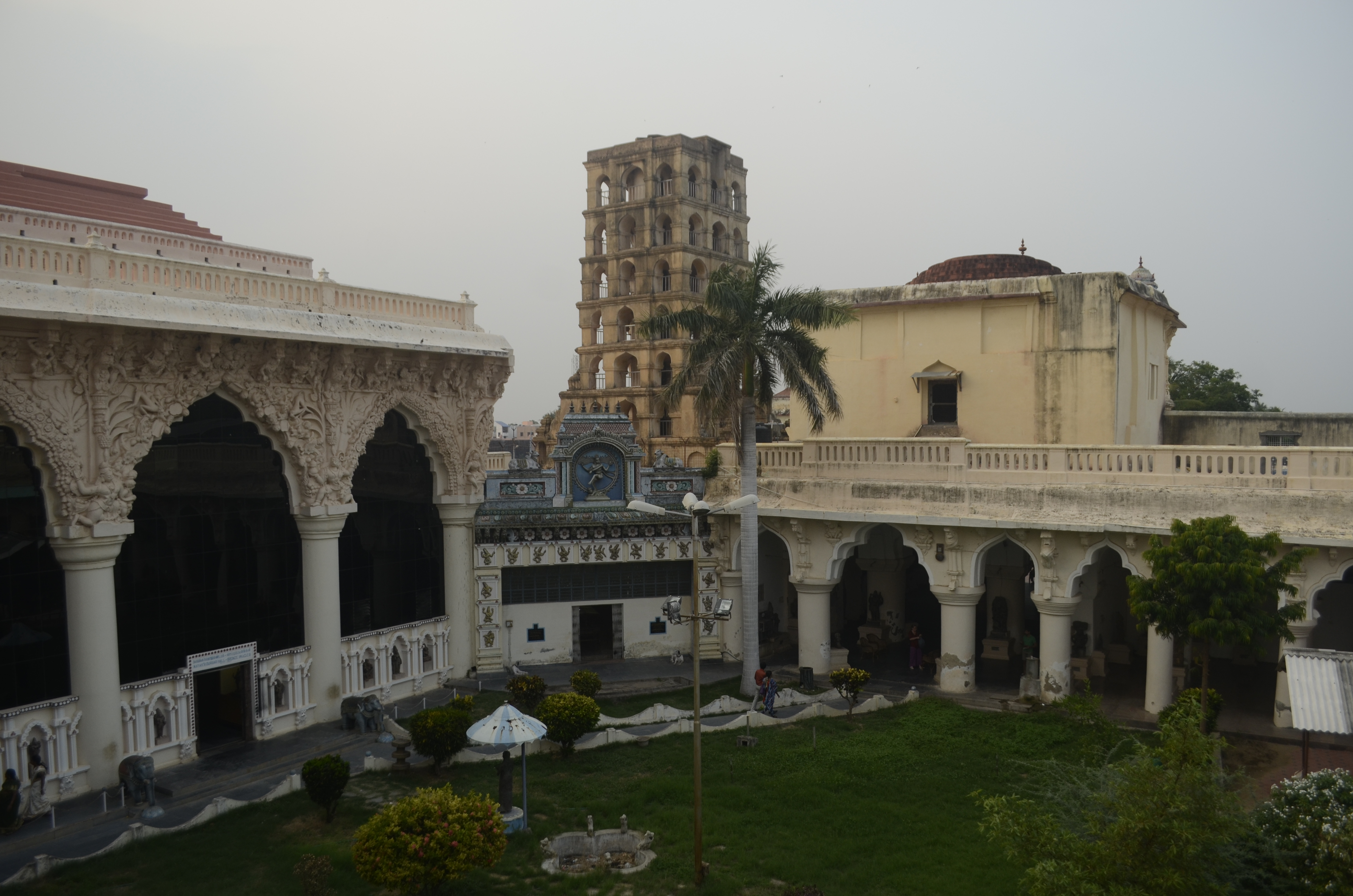
Courtyard of the palace

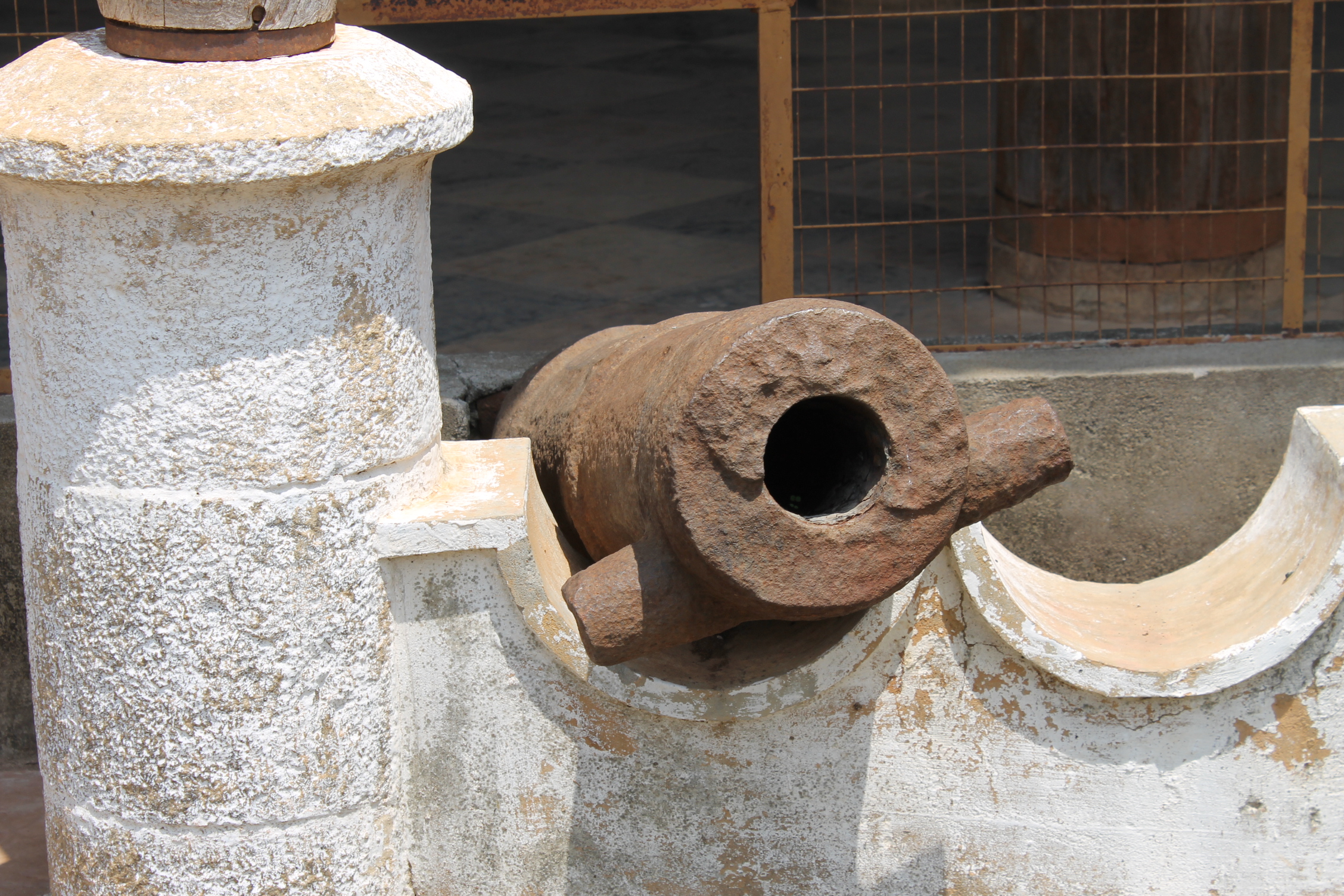
A cannon at the palace

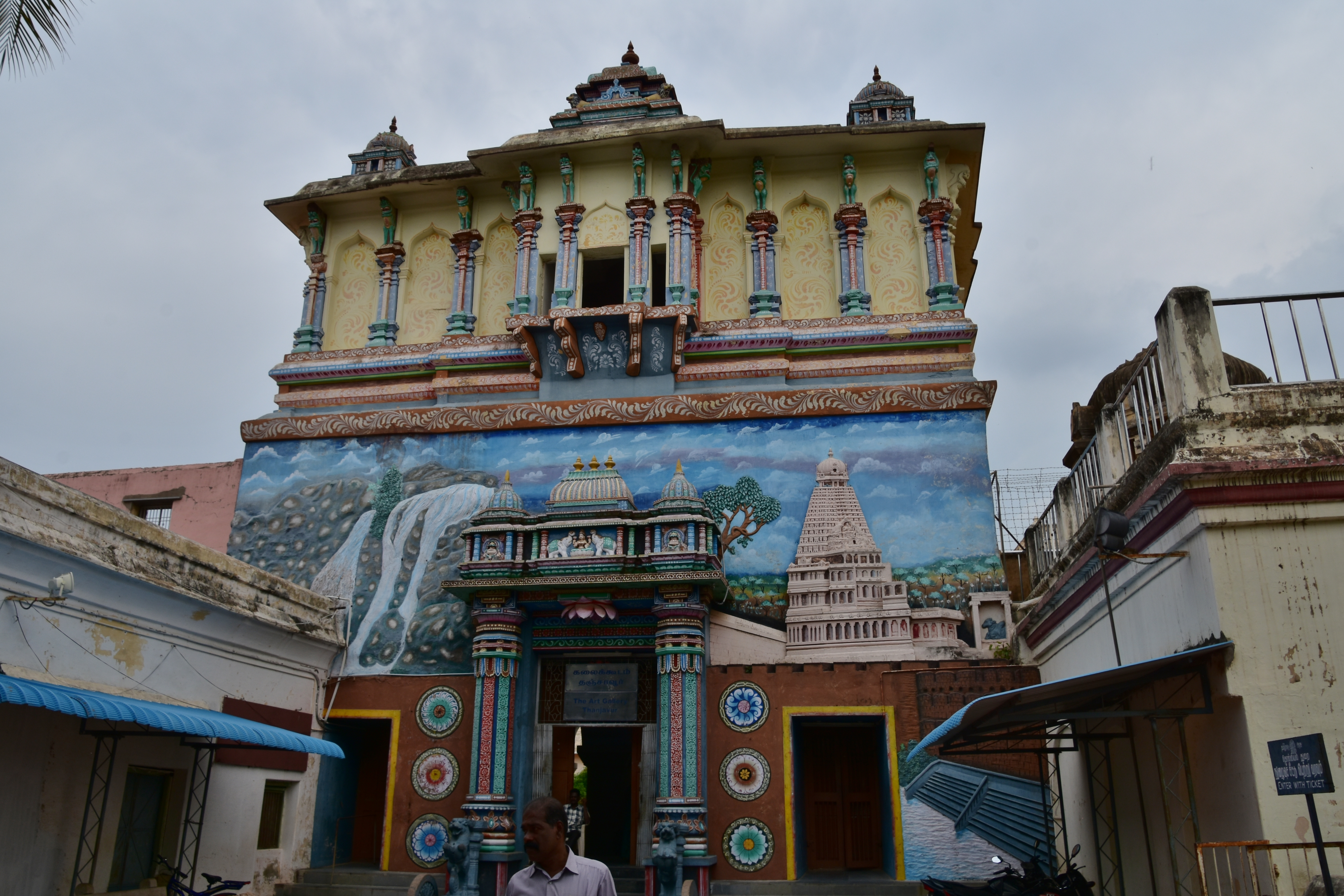
An Entrance of the palace

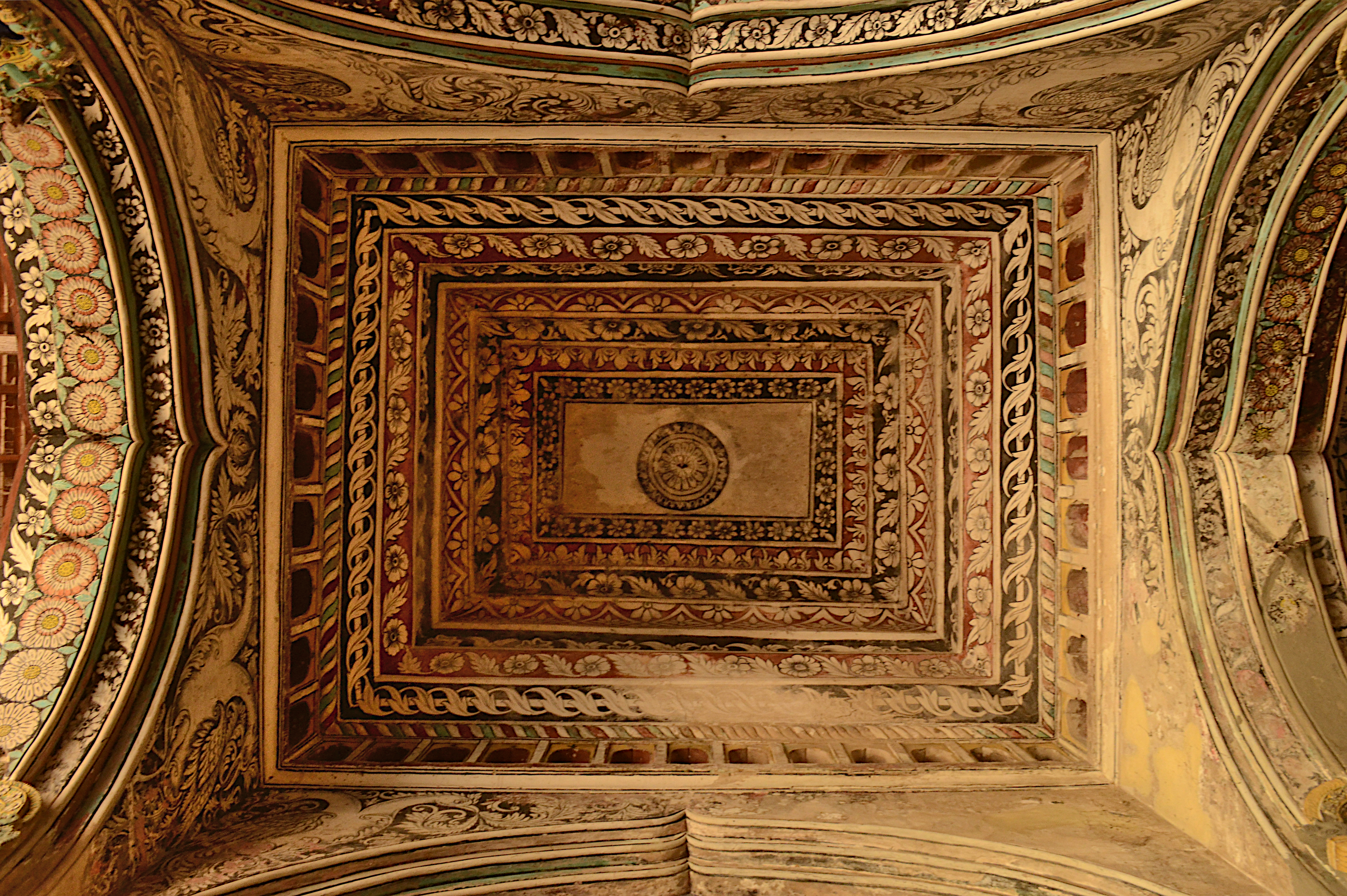
Palace interiors

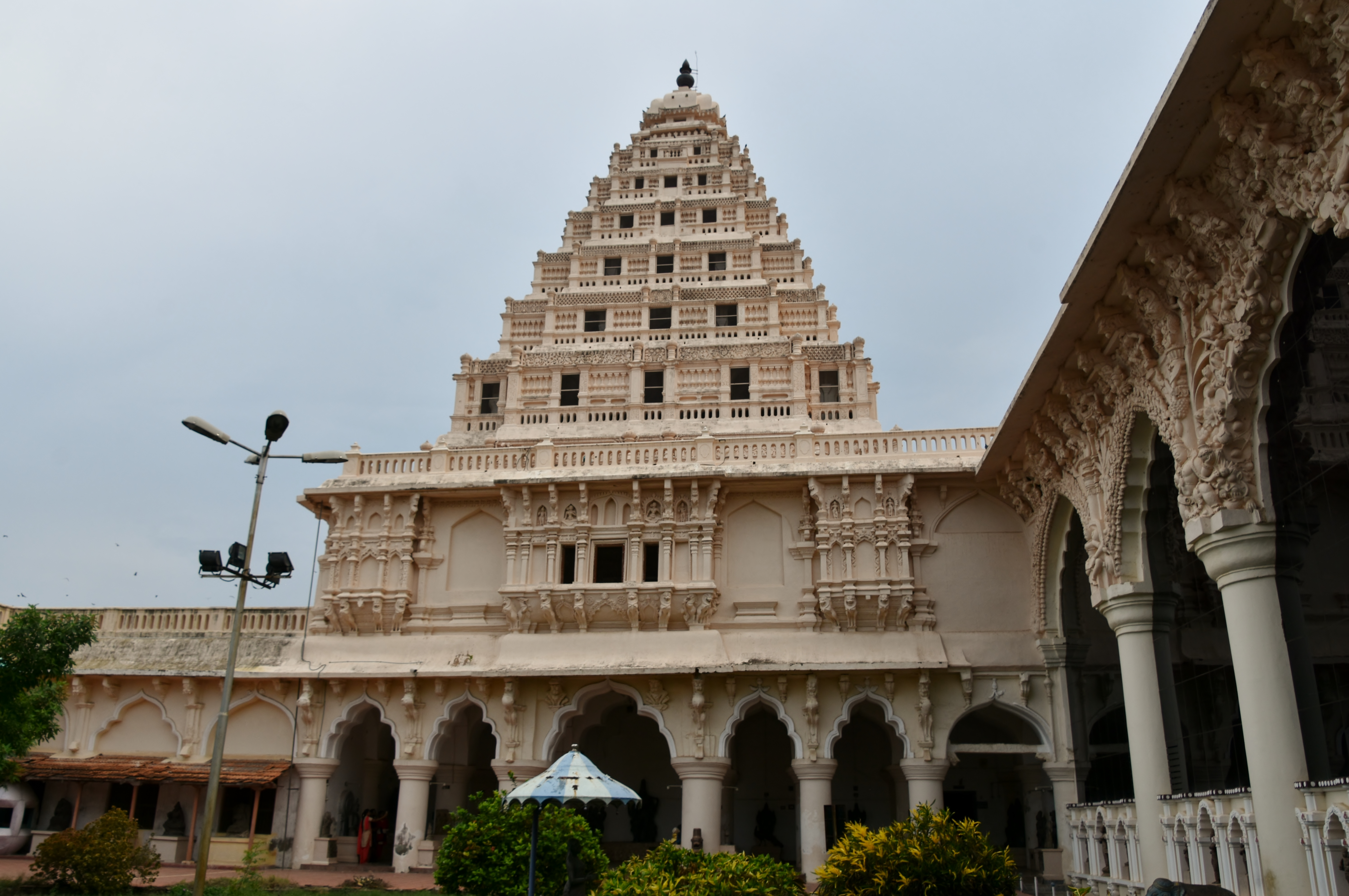
Palace pyramidal tower

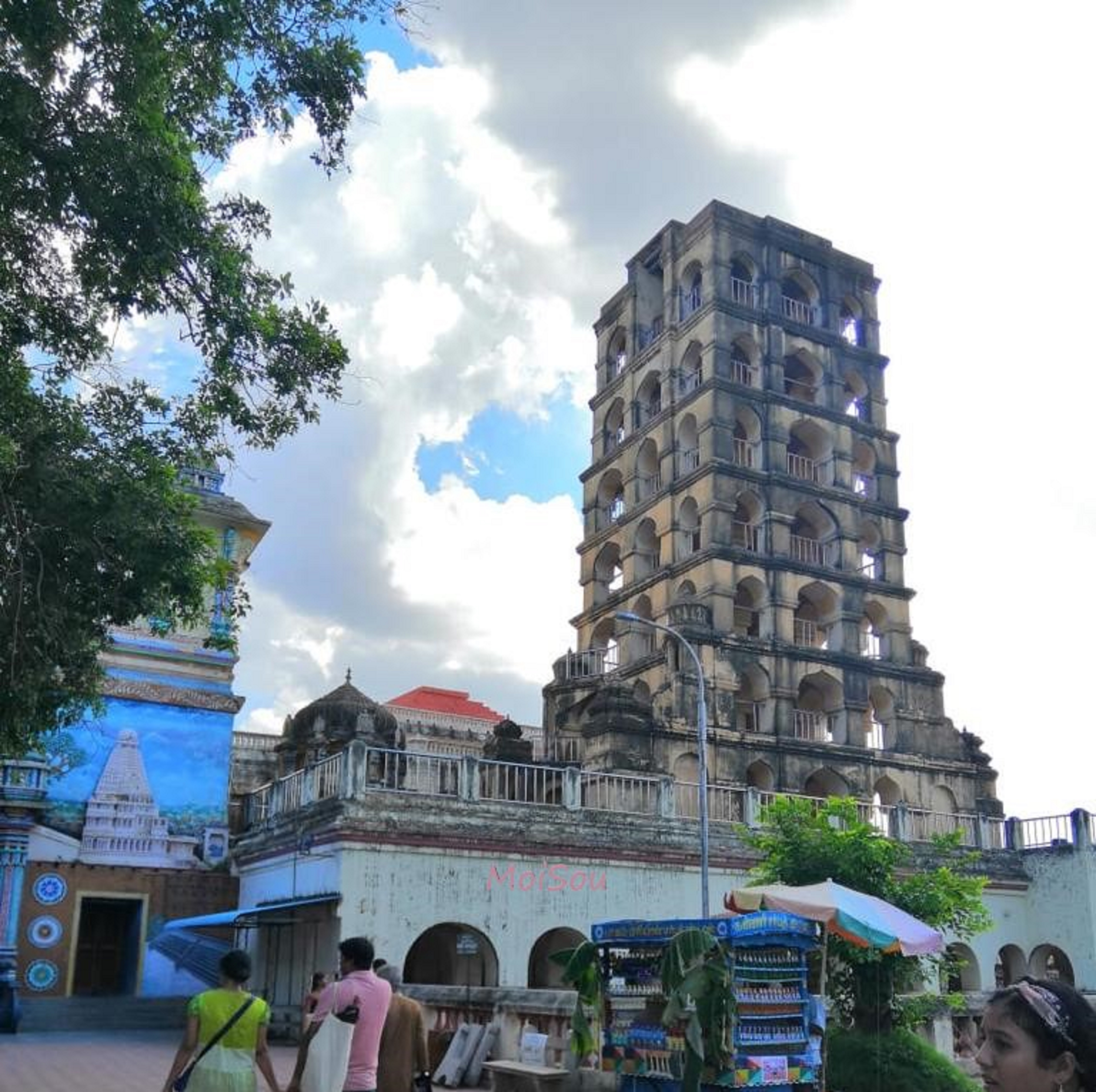
Bell tower

== See also ==
Similar palaces in historical and architectural contexts :

- Old Palace (Pudukkottai) of the Pudukkottai Tondaimans
- Chokkanatha Nayak Palace (Tiruchirappalli) of the Madurai Nayaks
- Thirumalai Nayak Palace (Madurai) of the Madurai Nayaks
- Ramalinga Vilasam (Ramanathapuram) of the Ramnad Setupatis
- Old Amba Vilas Palace (Mysore) of the Wodeyars
- Lotus Mahal (Hampi) of the Vijayanagara emperors
- Zenana Mahal (Hampi) of the Vijayanagara emperors

Other Maratha dynasties palaces :

- New Palace, Kolhapur of the Bhonsle Chhatrapatis
- Laxmi Vilas Palace, Vadodara of the Gaekwads
- Jai Vilas Palace, Gwalior of the Scindias
- Rajwada, Indore of Holkars
- Shaniwar Wada, Pune of the Peshwas
