= Zenana Mahal =

Palace complex located in Hampi

Coordinates: 15°19′15″N 76°28′15″E

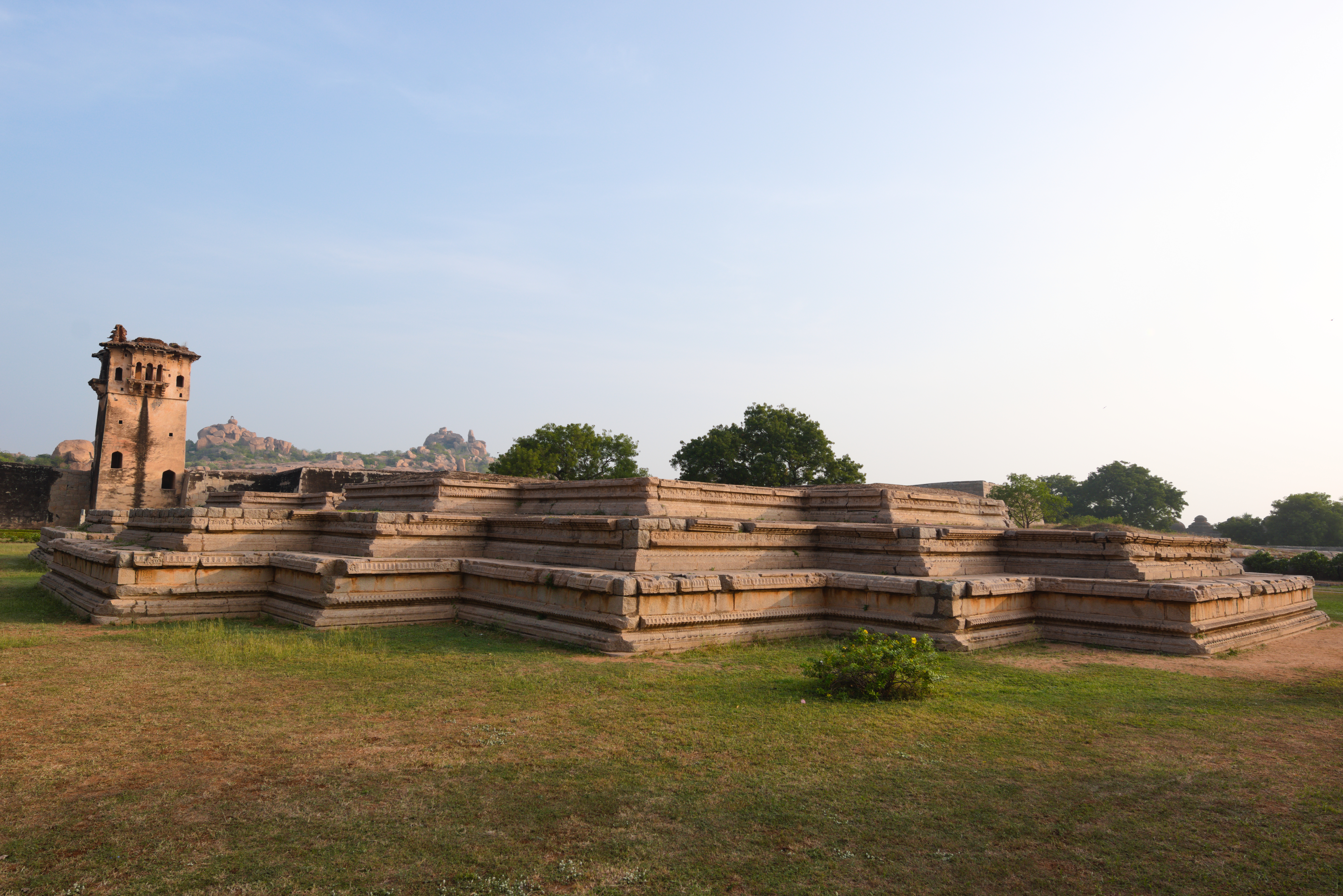
The Zenana Enclosure

The Zenana Mahal (also known as the Zenana Enclosure) is a palace complex located in the city of Hampi, which was the capital of the Vijayanagara Dynasty.

== History and architecture ==
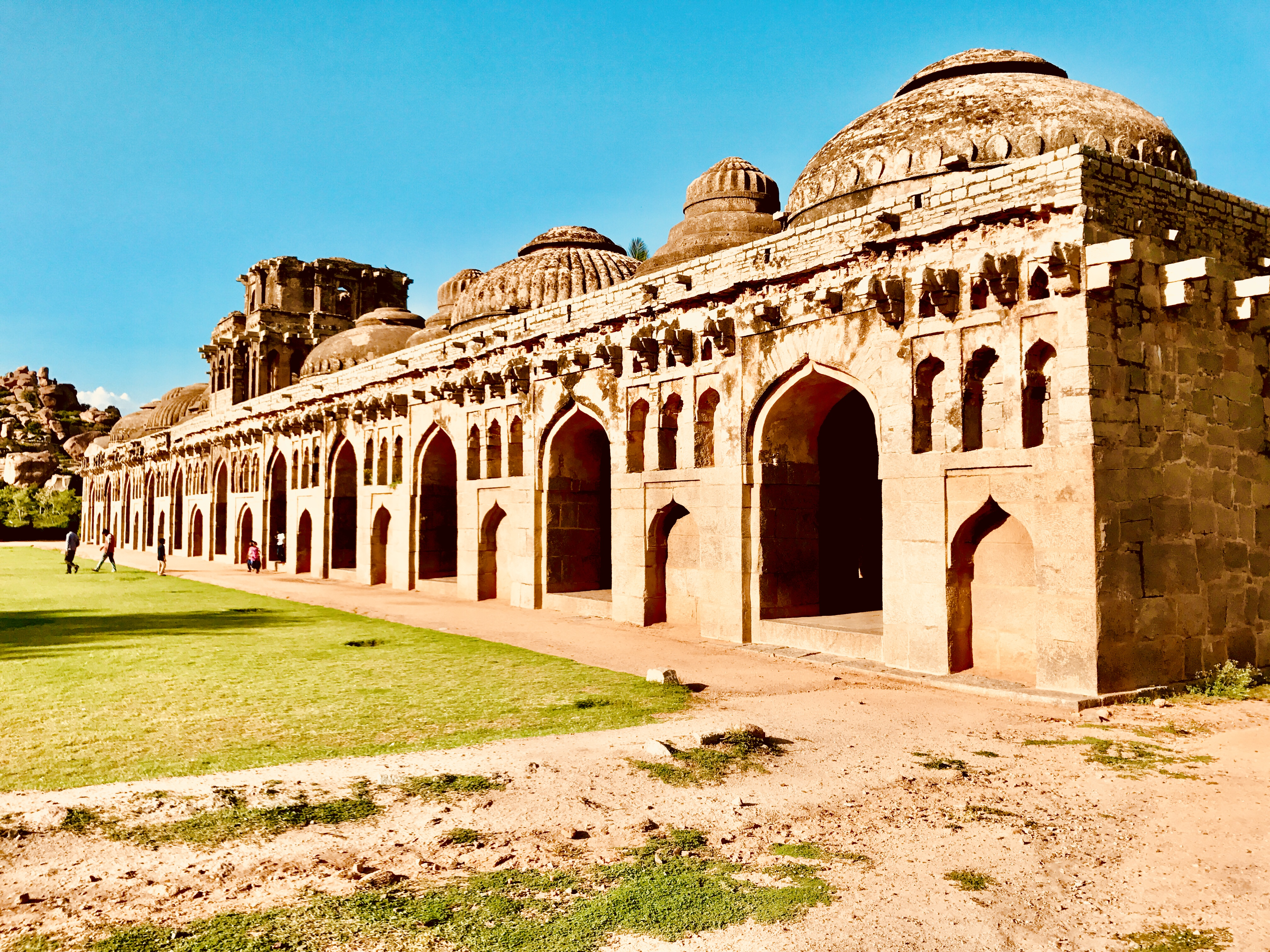
The elephant stables

The palace complex was built for the ladies of the harem (known as the zenana or anthapura). It stood on a secluded compound, and contains the walled palaces of the royal women. It has pleasure pavilions, quarters for female guards, watch towers, and elephant stables. Located in the southeast is the Kamala Mahal (lit.Lotus Palace), which was the residence of chief queens, who were known by the title of Patta Mahishi. There is a rectangular deep tank which was used to supply water to the palace. Opposite to the palace are the remnants of a water pavilion, and there are three two storied watch towers at the southeast, northeast and northwest corners where eunuch soldiers guarded the area.

A large water pavilion outside the queens quarters lies in the extreme southeast corner. Though called the Queen's Bath, it was most likely meant for male quarters and their female companions. There are balconies with arched windows overlooking the pool.

== Gallery ==
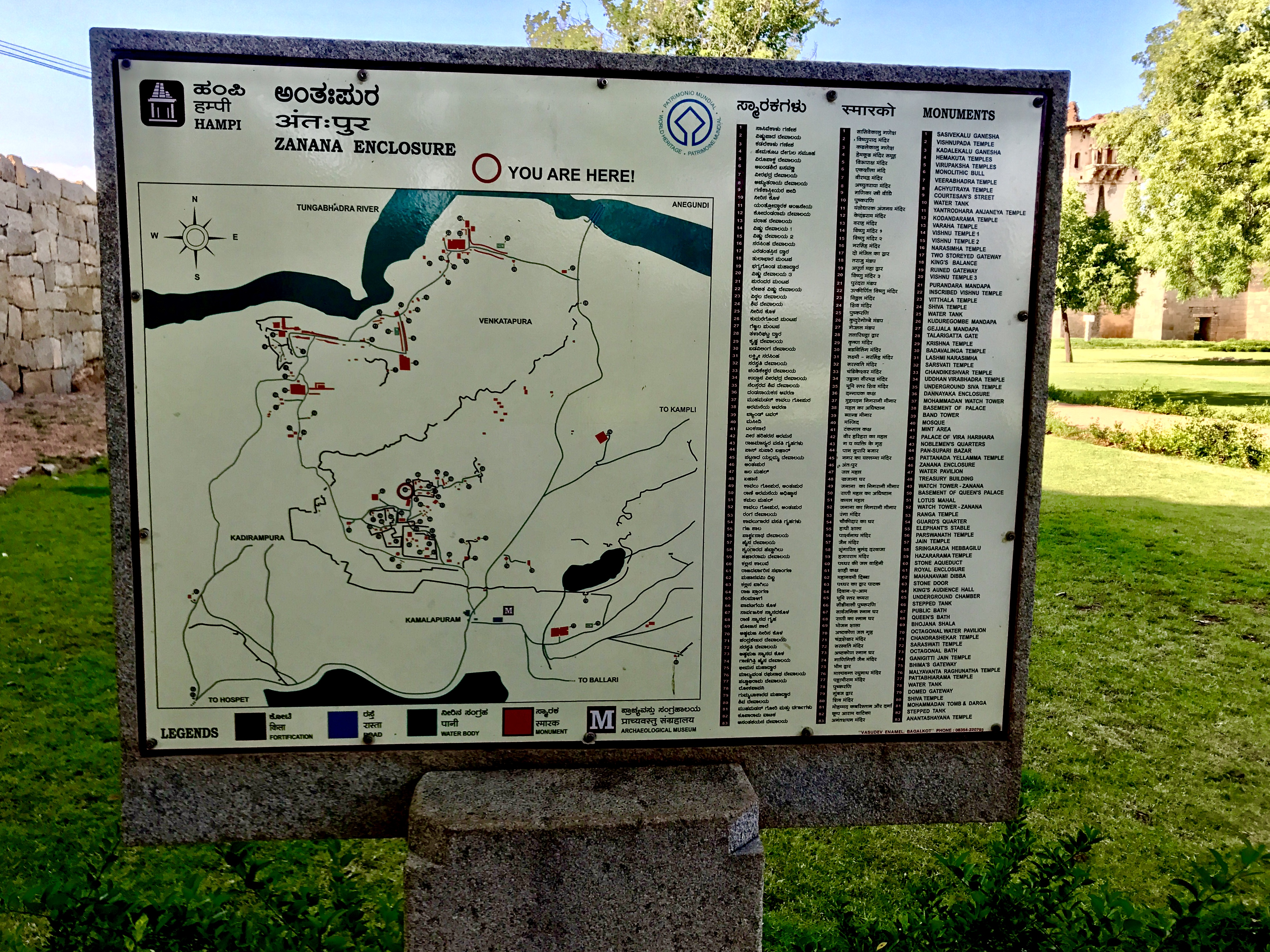
Map of Zanana Enclosure

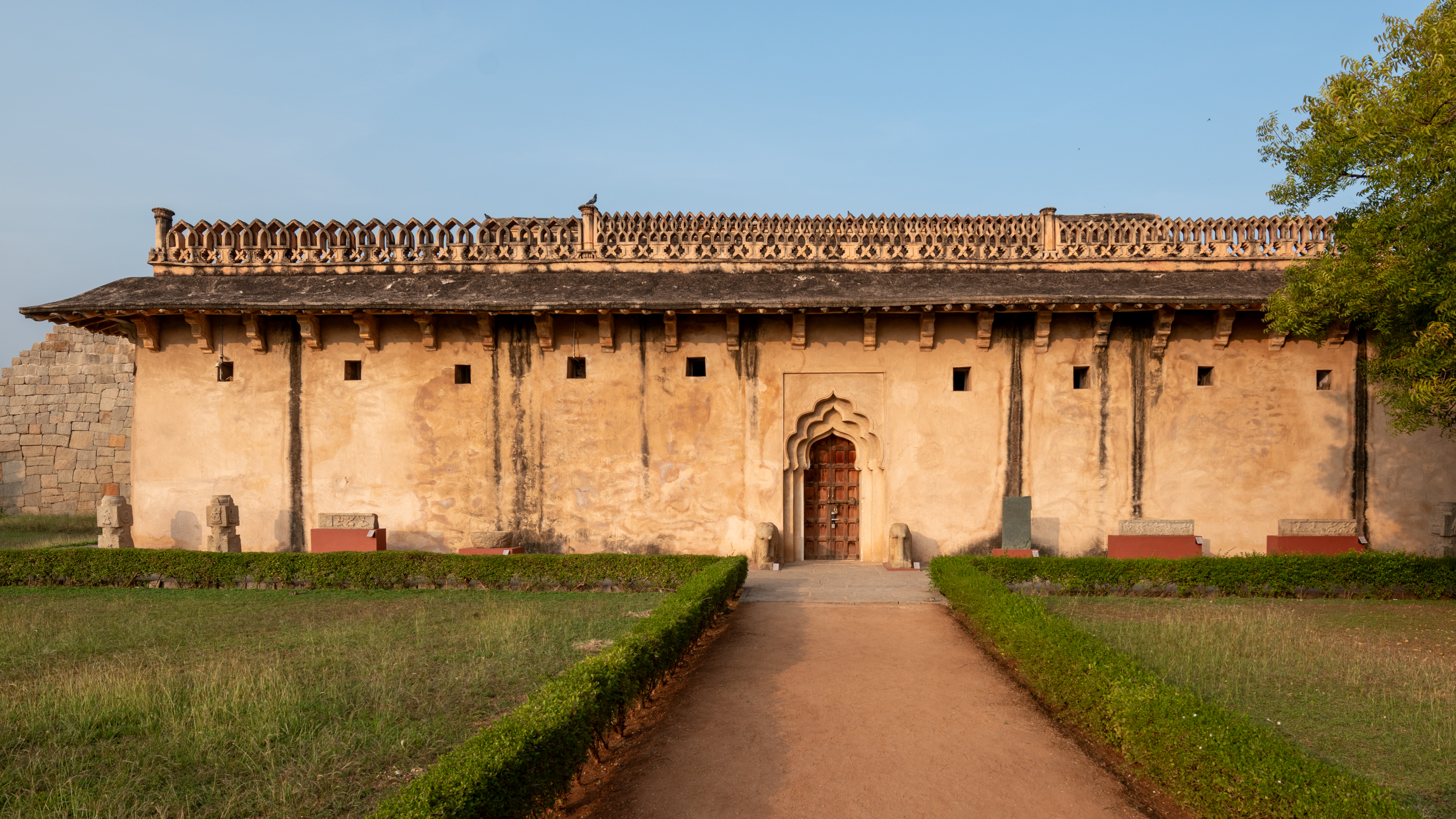
Treasury Building, Zanana enclosure

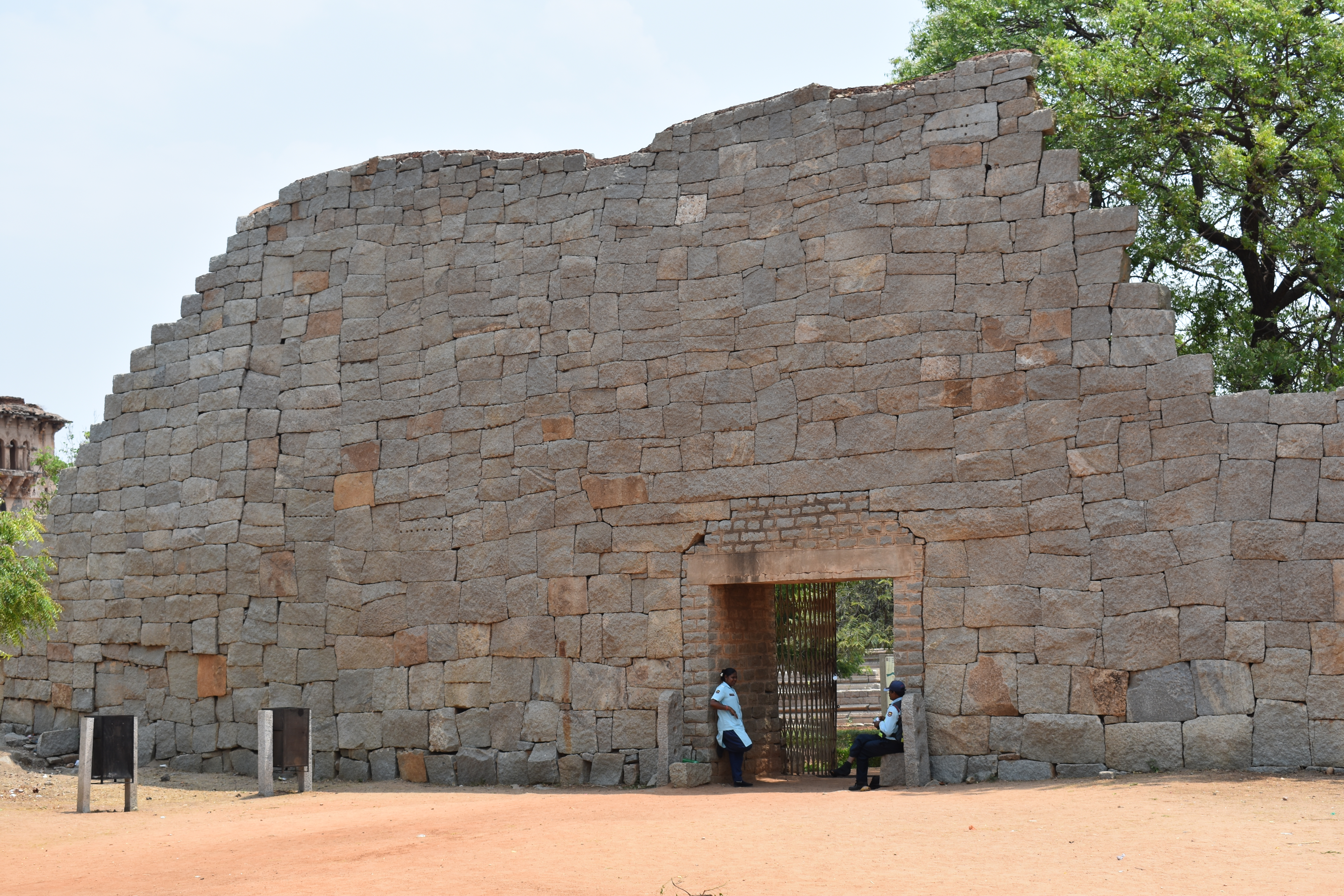
Door to the Zanana Enclosure

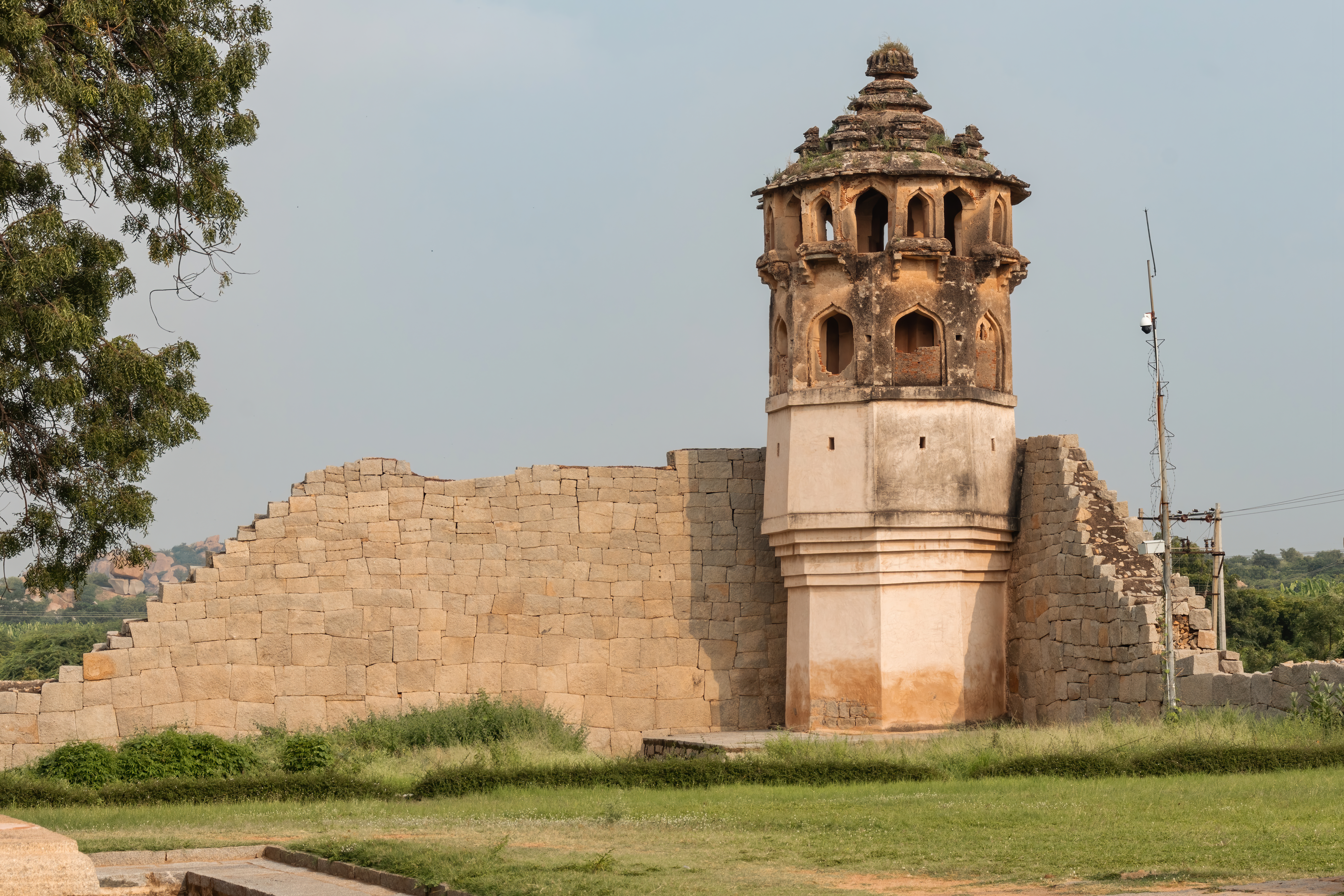
A watchtower inside the complex

== See also ==
- Kamala Mahal
