= Lotus Mahal =

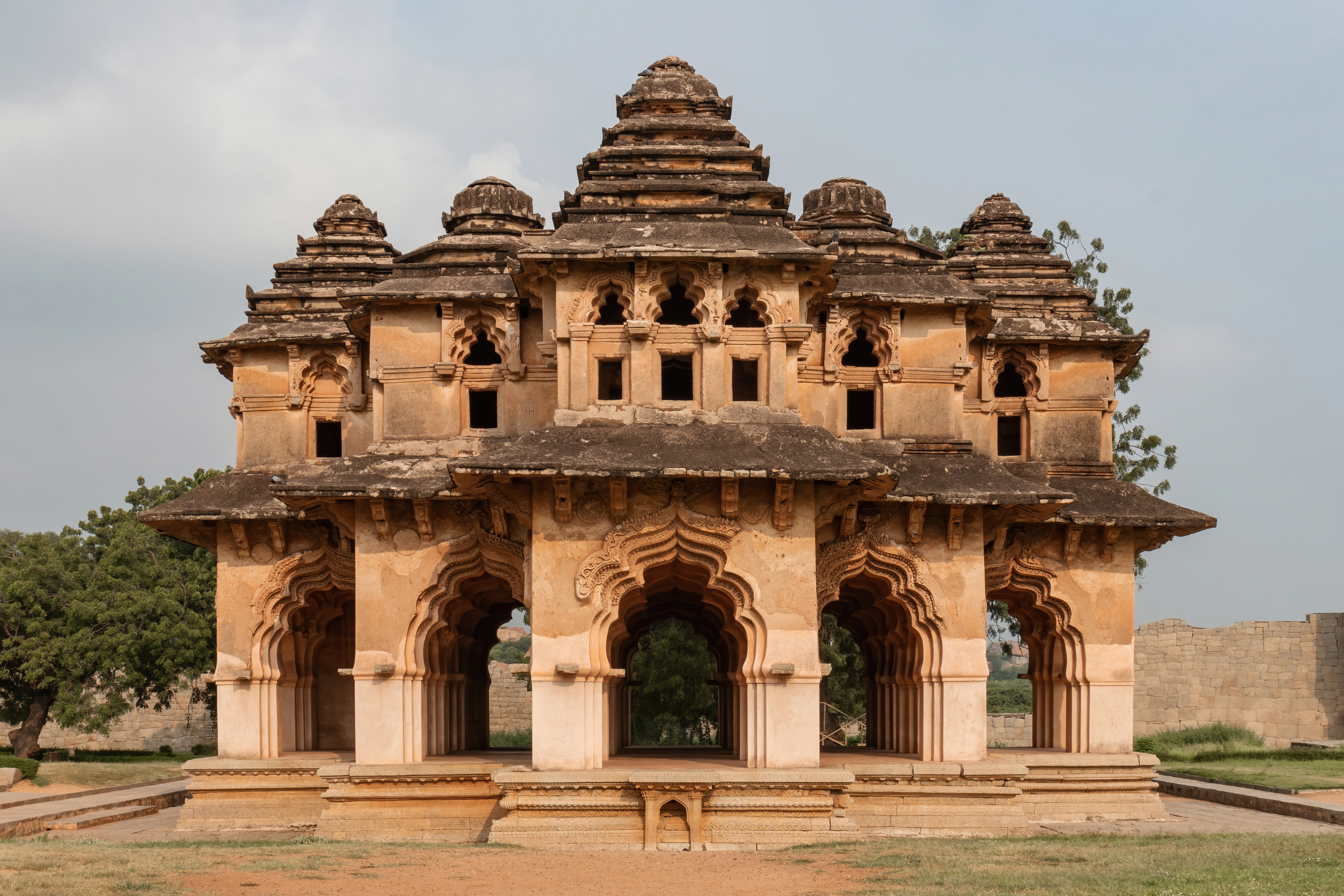
- Front view of the Lotus Mahal

- Location within Karnataka Location within India
- Alternative names: Chitrangi Mahal

General information
- Architectural style: Indo-Islamic
- Location: Ballari district, Karnataka, India
- Coordinates: 15°32′03″N 76°47′13″E

Technical details
- Floor count: Two storey

Lotus Mahal or Chitrangini Mahal is an important secular structure in Hampi, India. The Lotus Mahal is an example of Vijayanagara style of architecture and is a two storied structure built in Rubble masonry and finely plastered. The structure was used as residue place for royal family of the Vijayanagara Empire.

== Architecture ==
Lotus Mahal literally means "Palace of Lotus". This structure was made for the royal family of the Vijayanagara Empire. The palace stands around a walled compound near the Royal centre. The structure is laid out symmetrically with equal projections on four sides. The dome gives an illustration of an open lotus bud. The curves of the palace are inspired by the Islamic architecture and protect the palace from harsh weather conditions. It has two stories, both with arched openings in multiple planes surrounded by elaborate plaster designs. It has total of eight pyramidal towers over the corners and one big tower in the middle of the structure and is supported by 24 pillars. The pyramidal tower is influenced by Indian Architecture. The pillars are decorated with stone carved aquatic animals, plants etc.

The palace is built by bricks and mortar. The ground floor is raised on a high ornamental stone basement with doubled recessed angles.

== History ==
The palace is built in the Zenana enclosure and was reserved for the royal women of the Vijayanagara Empire. According to historical accounts, the structure was built to serve the royal Muslim women of the empire. Also the king, Krishnadevaraya used it as his council chamber for meetings with his ministers. The palace was also used as a relaxing place for the royal family. It is one of the few structures that did not suffer any major damage when Hampi was invaded. Owing to many invasions by Deccan sultanates and improper maintenance, the palace has ruined and has lost most of its carved decoration in the restoration work.

== Gallery ==
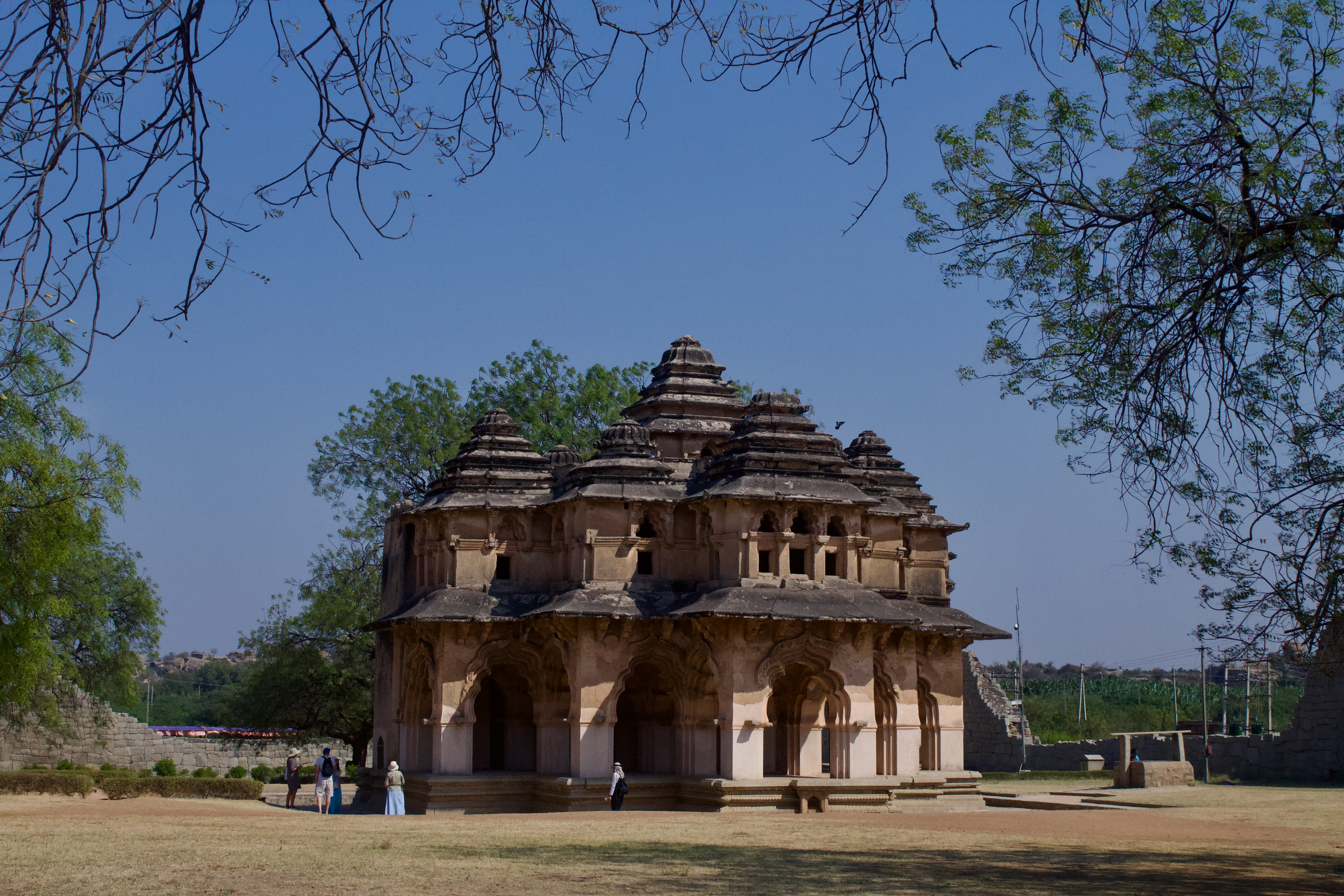
View of Lotus temple from Right Side Wing

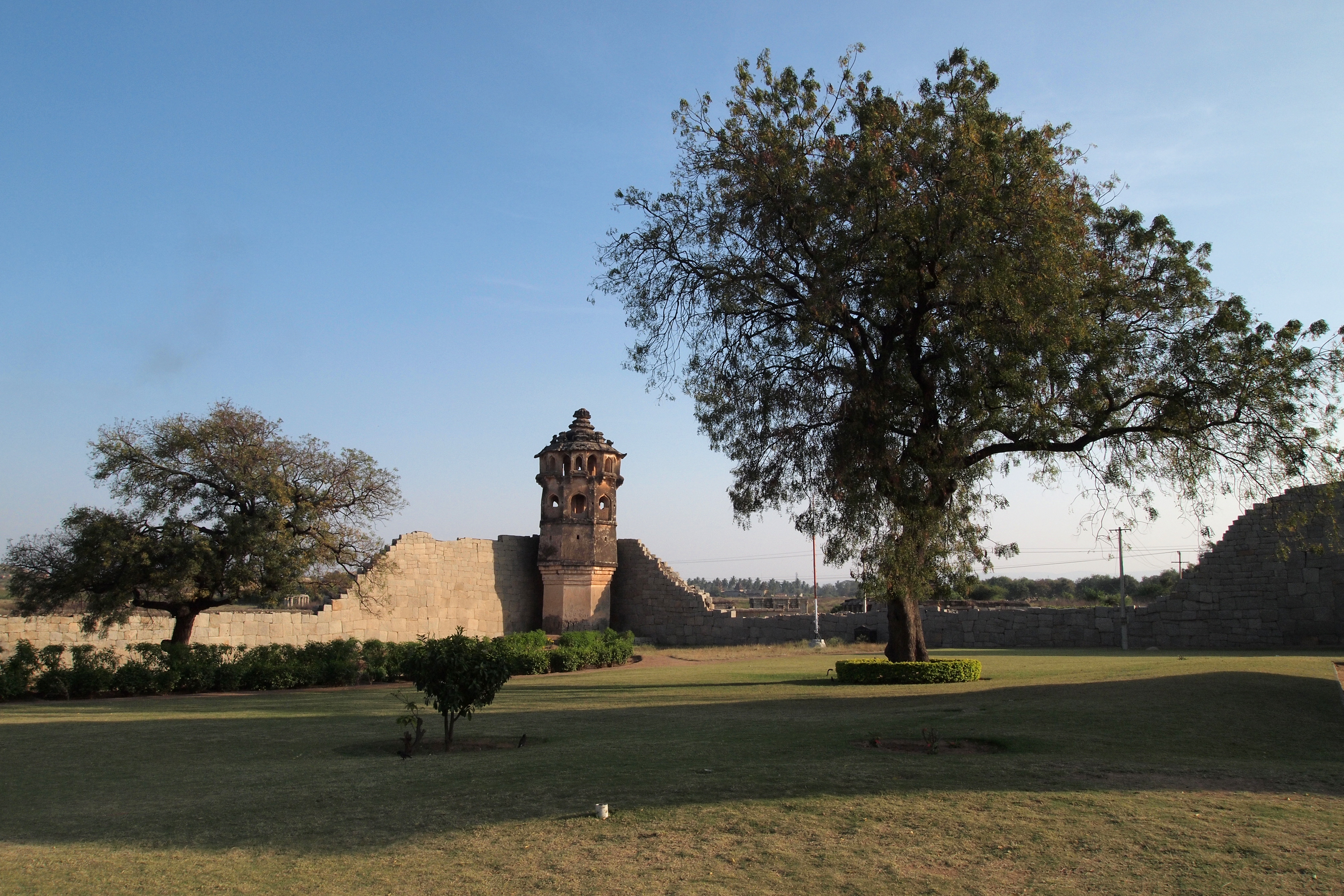
Watch tower near the palace

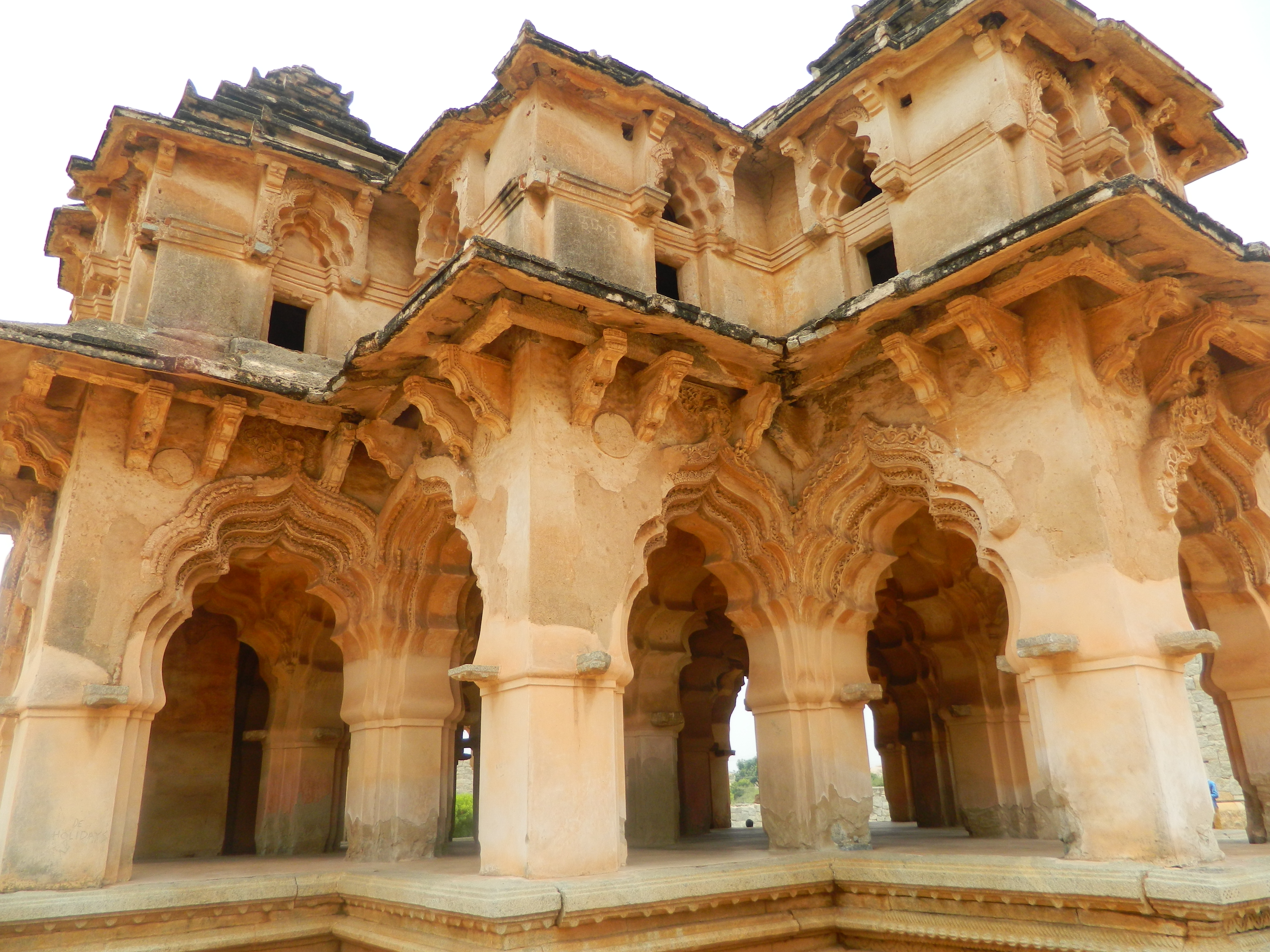
Pillars

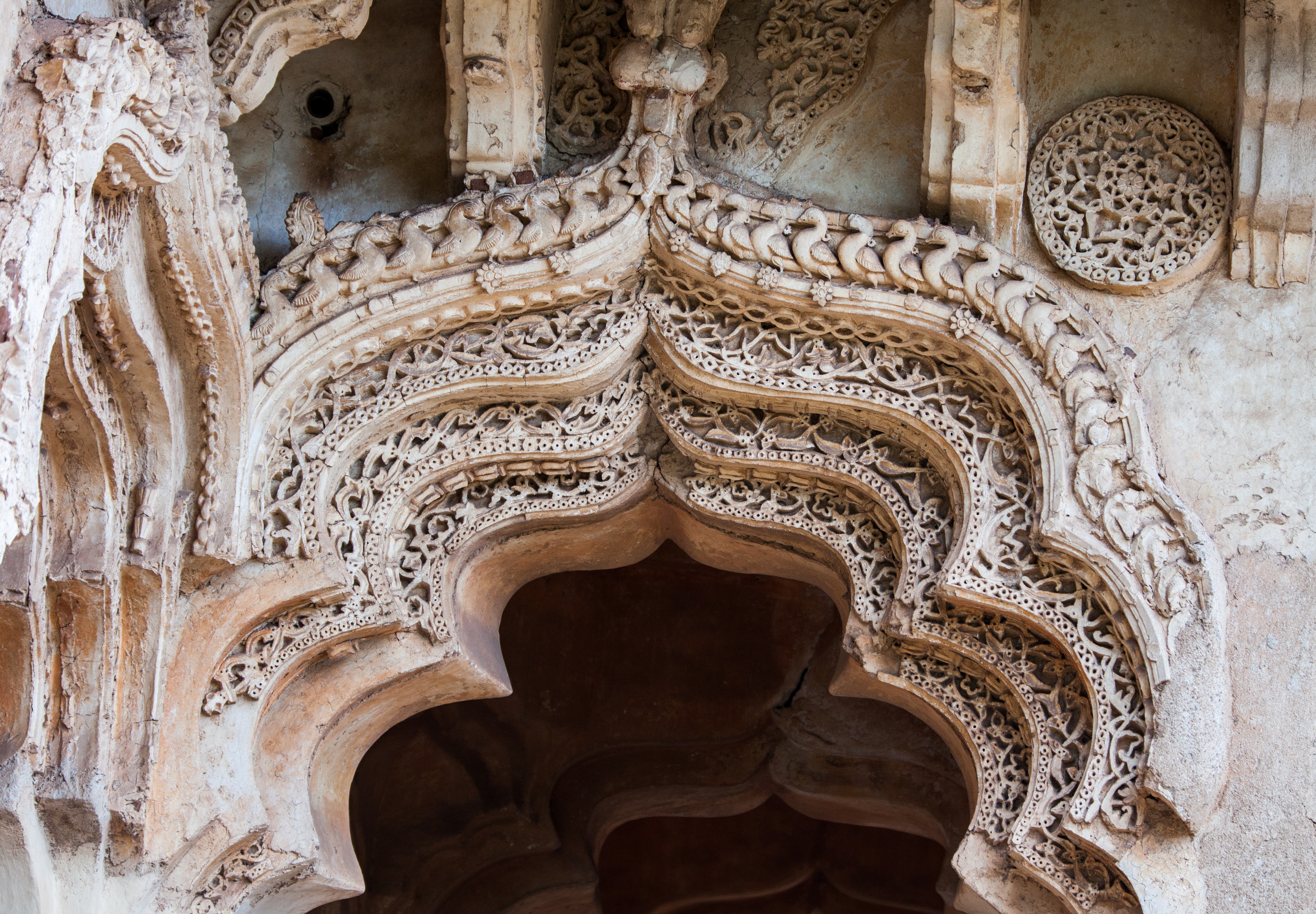
Carvings

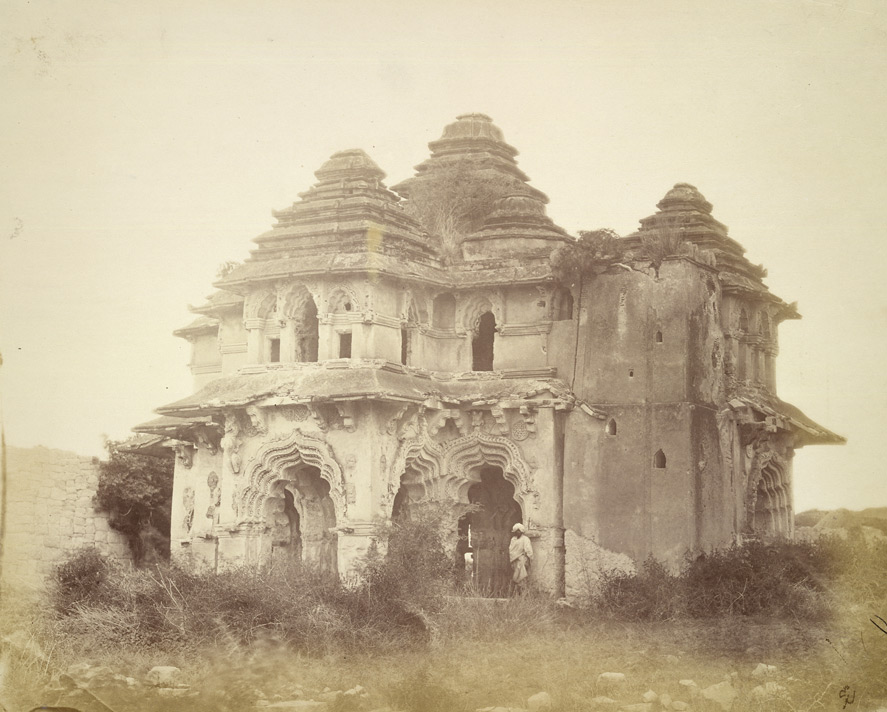
Lotus Mahal in 1885

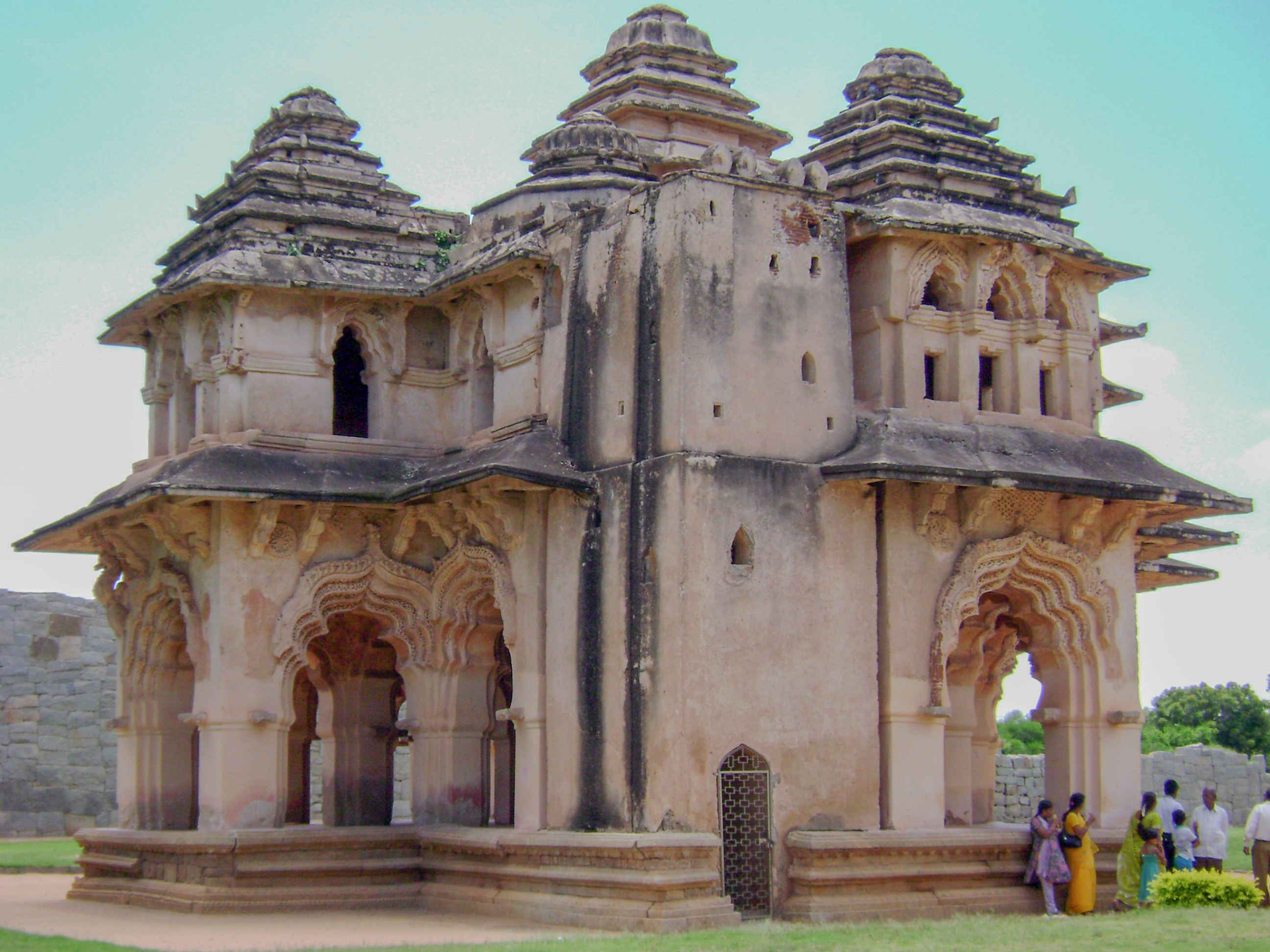
View of the Entrance

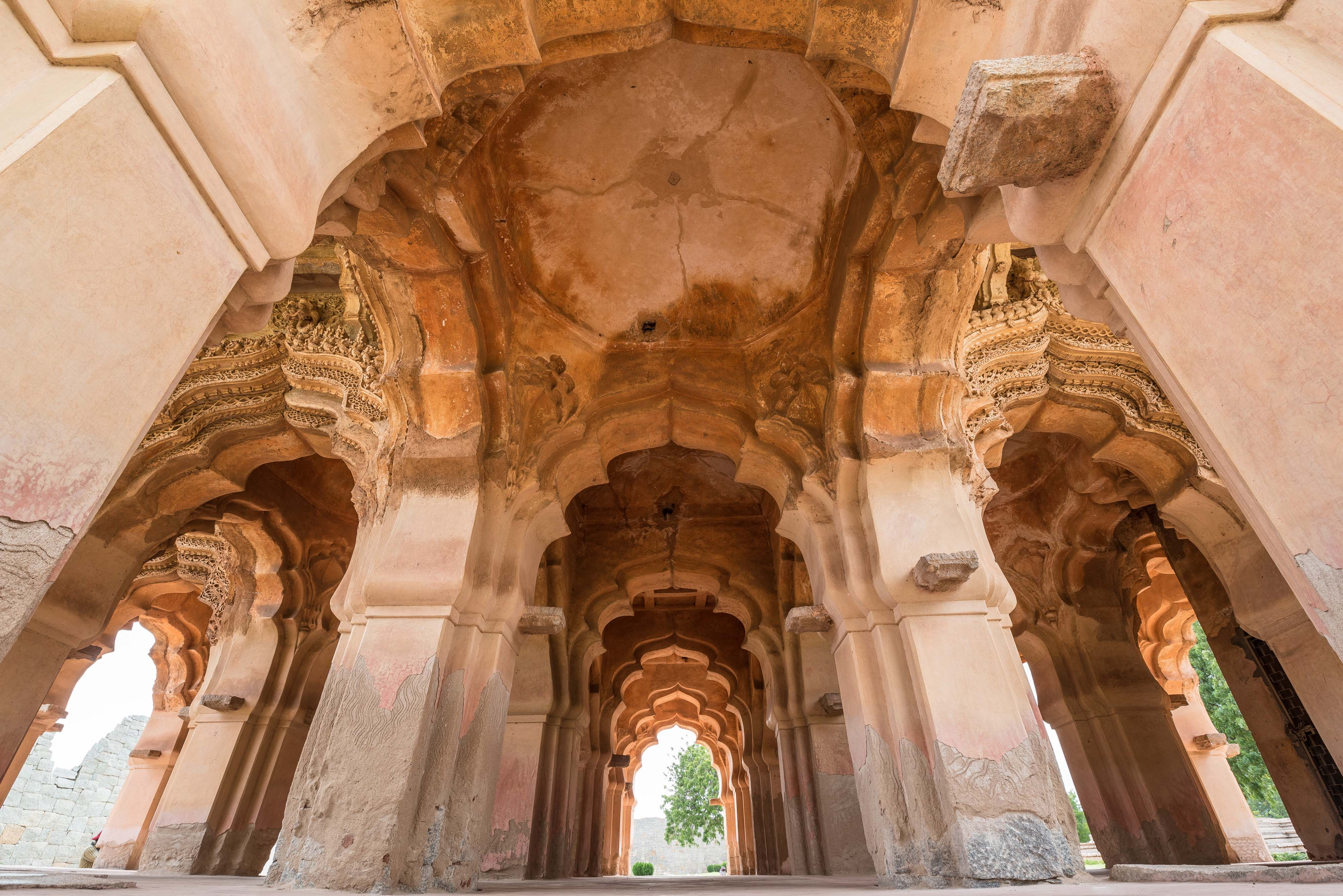
The ceiling

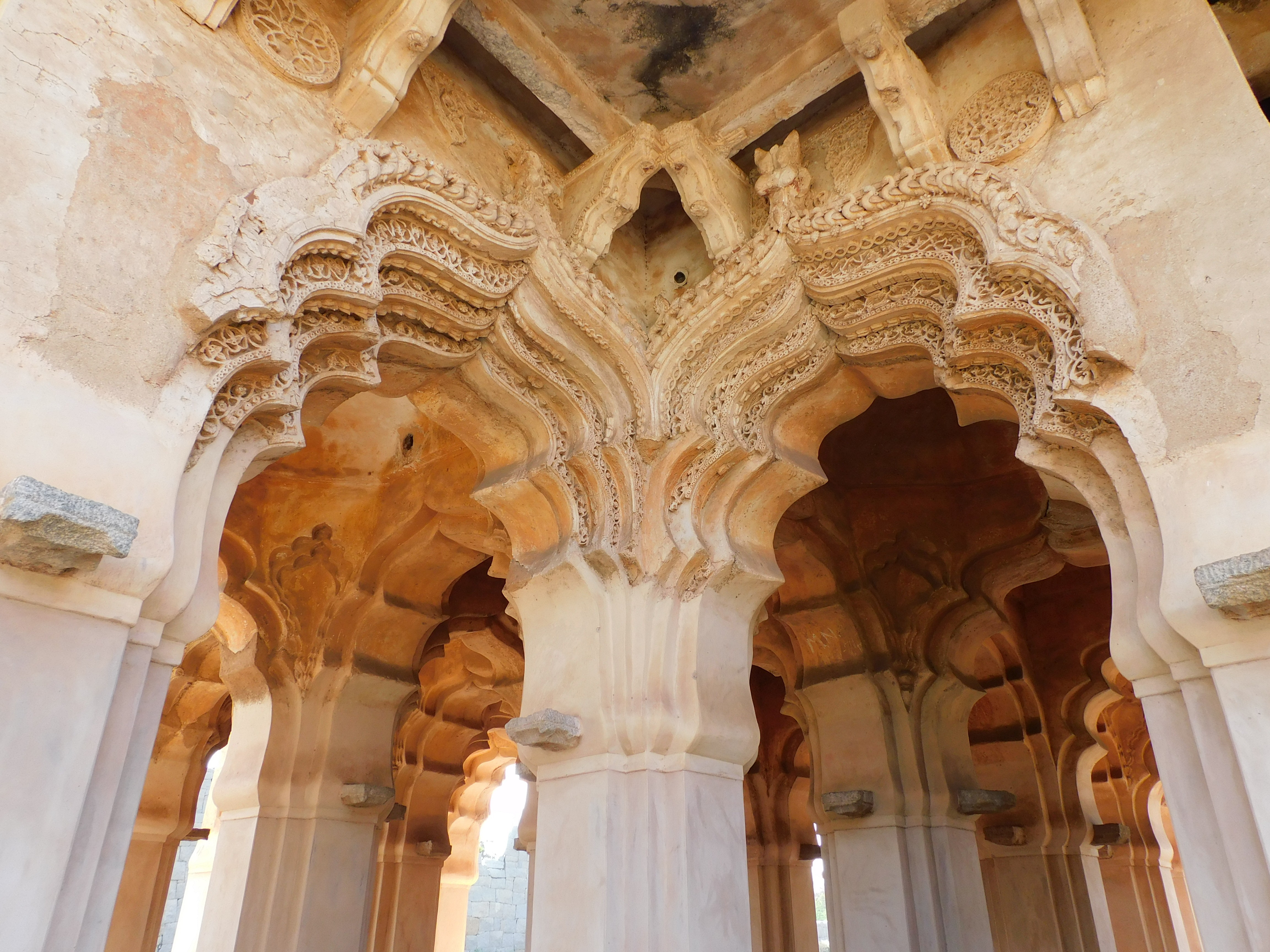
arches
