= List of Monuments of National Importance in West Bengal =

This is a list of Monuments of National Importance (ASI) as officially recognized by and available through the website of the Archaeological Survey of India in the Indian state West Bengal. The monument identifier is a combination of the abbreviation of the subdivision of the list (state, ASI circle) and the numbering as published on the website of the ASI. 133 Monuments of National Importance have been recognized by the ASI in West Bengal.

== List of monuments of national importance ==
SL. No.	Description	Location	Address	District	Coordinates	Image
N-WB-1	Chandraketu's Fort	Berachampa		24 Parganas (North)	22°40′47″N 88°41′29″E	Chandraketu's Fort More images
N-WB-2	Ancient mound known as Barah Mihirer Dhipi also known as Khana Mihirer Dhibi	Deulia & Kaukipara		24 Parganas (North)	22°41′51″N 88°41′19″E	Ancient mound known as Barah Mihirer Dhipi also known as Khana Mihirer Dhibi More images
N-WB-3	Clive's House Dum Dum known as Barakothi	Dum Dum		24 Parganas (North)	22°37′33″N 88°24′57″E	Clive's House Dum Dum known as Barakothi More images
N-WB-4	26 Siva Temples	Barrackpore - Khardaha		24 Parganas (North)	22°43′31″N 88°21′45″E	26 Siva Temples More images
N-WB-5	Warren Hasting's House	Barasat		24 Parganas (North)	22°43′21″N 88°29′17″E	Warren Hasting's House More images
N-WB-6	Jatar Deul	Jata		24 Parganas (South)	21°59′40″N 88°29′24″E	Jatar Deul More images
N-WB-7	Bahulara Ancient Temple	Bahulara		Bankura	23°09′58″N 87°14′07″E	Bahulara Ancient Temple More images
N-WB-8	Dalmadal Cannon and the platform on which it is mounted	Bishnupur		Bankura	23°03′48″N 87°19′15″E	Dalmadal Cannon and the platform on which it is mounted More images
N-WB-9	Gate of Old Fort	Bishnupur		Bankura	23°04′28″N 87°19′34″E	Gate of Old Fort More images
N-WB-10	Jor Mandir	Bishnupur		Bankura	23°03′37″N 87°19′19″E	Jor Mandir More images
N-WB-11	Jor Bangla Temple	Bishnupur		Bankura	23°04′18″N 87°19′36″E	Jor Bangla Temple More images
N-WB-12	Kalachand Temple	Bishnupur		Bankura	23°03′32″N 87°19′33″E	Kalachand Temple More images
N-WB-13	Lalji Temple	Bishnupur		Bankura	23°04′24″N 87°19′37″E	Lalji Temple More images
N-WB-14	Madan Gopal Temple	Bishnupur		Bankura	23°04′35″N 87°18′43″E	Madan Gopal Temple More images
N-WB-15	Madan Mohan Temple	Bishnupur		Bankura	23°04′51″N 87°19′24″E	Madan Mohan Temple More images
N-WB-16	Malleswar Temple	Bishnupur		Bankura	23°04′47″N 87°19′13″E	Malleswar Temple More images
N-WB-17	Murali Mohan Temple	Bishnupur		Bankura	23°04′55″N 87°19′04″E	Murali Mohan Temple More images
N-WB-18	Nanda Lal Temple	Bishnupur		Bankura	23°03′41″N 87°19′23″E	Nanda Lal Temple More images
N-WB-19	Patpur Temple	Bishnupur		Bankura	23°04′30″N 87°20′14″E	Patpur Temple More images
N-WB-20	Radha Binod Temple	Bishnupur		Bankura	23°04′51″N 87°19′40″E	Radha Binod Temple More images
N-WB-21	Radha Gobind Temple	Bishnupur		Bankura	23°03′36″N 87°19′23″E	Radha Gobind Temple More images
N-WB-22	Radha Madhab Temple	Bishnupur		Bankura	23°03′35″N 87°19′29″E	Radha Madhab Temple More images
N-WB-23	Radha Shyam Temple	Bishnupur		Bankura	23°04′21″N 87°19′35″E	Radha Shyam Temple More images
N-WB-24	Rasmancha	Bishnupur		Bankura	23°04′06″N 87°19′19″E	Rasmancha More images
N-WB-25	Shyam Rai Temple	Bishnupur		Bankura	23°04′16″N 87°19′27″E	Shyam Rai Temple More images
N-WB-26	Small gateway of fort	Bishnupur		Bankura	23°04′29″N 87°19′33″E	Small gateway of fort More images
N-WB-27	Stone chariot	Bishnupur		Bankura	23°04′32″N 87°19′34″E	Stone chariot More images
N-WB-28	Saileswar Temple	Dihar		Bankura	23°07′08″N 87°20′51″E	Saileswar Temple More images
N-WB-29	Sareswar Temple	Dihar		Bankura	23°07′09″N 87°20′51″E	Sareswar Temple More images
N-WB-30	Temple of Radha Damodar Jew	Ghutgarya		Bankura	23°26′12″N 87°15′18″E	Temple of Radha Damodar Jew More images
N-WB-31	Gokulchand Temple	Gokulnagar		Bankura	23°02′13″N 87°27′43″E	Gokulchand Temple More images
N-WB-32	Temple of Ratneswar	Jagannathpur		Bankura	23°20′55″N 87°17′59″E	Upload Photo
N-WB-33	Temple of Shyam Sunder	Madanpur		Bankura	23°24′16″N 87°23′48″E	Upload Photo
N-WB-34	Temple site now represented only by a mound and a statue of Surya	Pareshnath		Bankura		Upload Photo
N-WB-35	Temple site of an old Jain Temple now represented only by a Mound with a Jain statue	Pareshnath		Bankura	22°57′28″N 86°44′57″E	Temple site of an old Jain Temple now represented only by a Mound with a Jain statue More images
N-WB-36	Image of Durga slaying Mahisasura under a tree	Sarengarh		Bankura		Upload Photo
N-WB-37	Temple site now represented only by a mound	Sarengarh		Bankura		Upload Photo
N-WB-38	Temple site now represented only by a Mound with statues of Ganesh and Nandi on it	Sarengarh		Bankura		Upload Photo
N-WB-39	Temple site now represented only by a mound with an Image of Nandi on it	Sarengarh		Bankura		Upload Photo
N-WB-40	Rock Inscription of Chandra Varman	Susunia Hill		Bankura	23°23′32″N 86°59′05″E	Rock Inscription of Chandra Varman More images
N-WB-41	Temple of Radha Binod commonly known as Joydeb	Jaydev Kenduli		Birbhum	23°38′32″N 87°25′50″E	Temple of Radha Binod commonly known as Joydeb More images
N-WB-42	Temple of Dharmaraj	Kubilashpur		Birbhum	23°57′35″N 87°22′10″E	Upload Photo
N-WB-43	Two mounds	Bhadeswar		Birbhum		Upload Photo
N-WB-44	Temple of Basuli and the mound together with fourteen other temples near them containing the Linga images of Shiva	Nanoor		Birbhum	23°42′17″N 87°52′06″E	Temple of Basuli and the mound together with fourteen other temples near them containing the Linga images of Shiva More images
N-WB-45	Temple and Rasmancha (Damodar Temple)	Suri		Birbhum	23°54′15″N 87°31′56″E	Temple and Rasmancha (Damodar Temple) More images
N-WB-46	Baidyapur Jora Deul	Baidyapur		Purba Bardhaman	23°09′35″N 88°14′48″E	Baidyapur Jora Deul More images
N-WB-47	Rarheswar Temple	Bamunara		Paschim Bardhaman	23°30′57″N 87°22′44″E	Rarheswar Temple More images
N-WB-48	Begunia temples	Barakar		Paschim Bardhaman	23°44′08″N 86°48′49″E	Begunia temples More images
N-WB-49	Tomb of Baharam Sakka, Sher Afghan and Nawab Qutabuddin	Bardhaman		Purba Bardhaman	23°14′05″N 87°51′08″E	Tomb of Baharam Sakka, Sher Afghan and Nawab Qutabuddin More images
N-WB-50	Stone Temple	Garui		Paschim Bardhaman	23°43′08″N 86°56′29″E	Stone Temple More images
N-WB-51	Temple of Ichai Ghosh	Gourangapur		Paschim Bardhaman	23°36′34″N 87°27′07″E	Temple of Ichai Ghosh More images
N-WB-52	Ancient site	Nadhia		Burdwan		Upload Photo
N-WB-53	Jain brick temple known as Sat Deul	Deulia		Purba Bardhaman	23°09′05″N 88°02′40″E	Jain brick temple known as Sat Deul More images
N-WB-54	Group of 12 temples as below	Kalna		Purba Bardhaman		Group of 12 temples as below
N-WB-54-a	(i) Bijoy Vaidyanath Temple	Kalna		Purba Bardhaman	23°13′17″N 88°21′57″E	(i) Bijoy Vaidyanath Temple More images
N-WB-54-b	(ii) Giri Gobardhan Temple	Kalna		Purba Bardhaman	23°13′18″N 88°21′54″E	(ii) Giri Gobardhan Temple More images
N-WB-54-c	(iii) Gopalji Temple	Kalna		Purba Bardhaman	23°13′32″N 88°21′33″E	(iii) Gopalji Temple More images
N-WB-54-d	(iv) Jaleswar Temple	Kalna		Purba Bardhaman	23°13′15″N 88°21′52″E	(iv) Jaleswar Temple More images
N-WB-54-e	(v) Krishna Chandraji Temple	Kalna		Purba Bardhaman	23°13′16″N 88°21′56″E	(v) Krishna Chandraji Temple More images
N-WB-54-f	(vi) Lalji Temple	Kalna		Purba Bardhaman	23°13′19″N 88°21′55″E	(vi) Lalji Temple More images
N-WB-54-g	(vii) Nava-Kailasha Temple	Kalna		Purba Bardhaman	23°13′13″N 88°21′53″E	(vii) Nava-Kailasha Temple More images
N-WB-54-h	(viii) Pancharatha Temple	Kalna		Purba Bardhaman	23°13′17″N 88°21′55″E	(viii) Pancharatha Temple More images
N-WB-54-i	(ix) Pratapeswar Siva Temple in Rajbari compound	Kalna		Purba Bardhaman	23°13′16″N 88°21′54″E	(ix) Pratapeswar Siva Temple in Rajbari compound More images
N-WB-54-j	(x) Rameswar Temple	Kalna		Purba Bardhaman	23°13′21″N 88°21′53″E	(x) Rameswar Temple More images
N-WB-54-k	(xi) Ratneswar Temple	Kalna		Purba Bardhaman	23°13′14″N 88°21′55″E	(xi) Ratneswar Temple More images
N-WB-54-l	(xii) Rupeswar Temple	Kalna		Purba Bardhaman	23°13′17″N 88°21′55″E	(xii) Rupeswar Temple More images
N-WB-55	Ancient site and remains of Pandu Rajar Dhibi	Panduk		Purba Bardhaman	23°34′53″N 87°38′33″E	Ancient site and remains of Pandu Rajar Dhibi More images
N-WB-56	Ancient mound	Bharatpur		Purba Bardhaman	23°24′42″N 87°26′48″E	Ancient mound More images
N-WB-57	Cooch Behar Palace	Cooch Bihar		Cooch Bihar	26°19′37″N 89°26′19″E	Cooch Behar Palace More images
N-WB-58	Rajpat	Khalisa Gosanimari		Cooch Bihar	26°09′05″N 89°21′01″E	Rajpat More images
N-WB-59	Tomb of Alexander-Cosma de Koros	Darjeeling		Darjeeling	27°03′09″N 88°15′33″E	Tomb of Alexander-Cosma de Koros More images
N-WB-60	Tomb of General George W. Aylmer Lloyd	Darjeeling		Darjeeling	27°03′09″N 88°15′32″E	Tomb of General George W. Aylmer Lloyd More images
N-WB-61	Dargah of Shah Ata	Gangarampur		Dinajpur (South)	25°24′03″N 88°31′53″E	Dargah of Shah Ata More images
N-WB-62	Bangarh	Gangarampur		Dinajpur (South)	25°24′51″N 88°31′41″E	Bangarh More images
N-WB-63 a	Hangeshwari Temple	Bansberia		Hooghly	22°57′51″N 88°23′59″E	Hangeshwari Temple More images
N-WB-63 b	Ananta Basudeba Temple	Bansberia		Hooghly	22°57′52″N 88°23′58″E	Ananta Basudeba Temple More images
N-WB-64	Dutch Cemetery, Chinsurah	Chinsurah		Hooghly	22°53′25″N 88°23′30″E	Dutch Cemetery, Chinsurah More images
N-WB-65	Dutch Memorial monument of Susan Anna Maria	Chinsurah		Hooghly	22°53′01″N 88°22′48″E	Dutch Memorial monument of Susan Anna Maria More images
N-WB-66	Group of temples known as Brindaban Chandra's Math	Guptipara		Hooghly	23°11′49″N 88°26′27″E	Group of temples known as Brindaban Chandra's Math More images
N-WB-67	Mounds	Mahanad		Hooghly		Upload Photo
N-WB-68	Minar	Pandua		Hooghly	23°04′28″N 88°17′04″E	Minar More images
N-WB-69	Mosque	Pandua		Hooghly	23°04′26″N 88°17′03″E	Mosque More images
N-WB-70	Sayed Jamaluddin Mosque & Tombs	Saptagram		Hooghly	22°57′38″N 88°22′10″E	Sayed Jamaluddin Mosque & Tombs More images
N-WB-71	Danish Cemetery, Serampore	Serampore		Hooghly	22°45′10″N 88°20′41″E	Danish Cemetery, Serampore More images
N-WB-72	Shrine and Mosque known as Dargah of Zafar Khan Gazi	Tribeni		Hooghly	22°58′46″N 88°24′04″E	Shrine and Mosque known as Dargah of Zafar Khan Gazi More images
N-WB-73	Dupleix Palace; Institute de Chandan Nagar	Chandan Nagar		Hooghly	22°51′24″N 88°22′10″E	Dupleix Palace Institute de Chandan Nagar More images
N-WB-74	Sri Mayer Ghat	Howrah		Howrah	22°37′55″N 88°21′27″E	Sri Mayer Ghat More images
N-WB-75	Metcalfe Hall	Kolkata		Kolkata	22°34′18″N 88°20′41″E	Metcalfe Hall More images
N-WB-76	St. John’s Church (Fabrics of the Church) (final notification not issued)	Kolkata		Kolkata	22°34′12″N 88°20′47″E	St. John’s Church (Fabrics of the Church) (final notification not issued) More images
N-WB-77	Currency Building	Dalhousie Square		Kolkata	22°34′14″N 88°21′01″E	Currency Building More images
N-WB-78	Asiatic Society Building	Park Street	1 Park Street. Kolkata - 700 016.	Kolkata	22°33′17″N 88°21′04″E	Asiatic Society Building More images
N-WB-79	Maghen David Synagogue	Ward No. 45		Kolkata	22°34′40″N 88°21′07″E	Maghen David Synagogue More images
N-WB-80	Beth-el-Synagogue	Pollock Street		Kolkata	22°34′33″N 88°21′08″E	Beth-el-Synagogue More images
N-WB-81	Adina Mosque	Pandua		Malda	25°09′10″N 88°09′50″E	Adina Mosque More images
N-WB-82	Baisgazi Wall	Gaur		Malda	24°52′15″N 88°07′31″E	Baisgazi Wall More images
N-WB-83	Baraduary Masjid or the Great Golden Mosque	Gaur		Malda	24°52′59″N 88°07′41″E	Baraduary Masjid or the Great Golden Mosque More images
N-WB-84	Bhita of Chand Sadagar	Gaur		Malda	24°51′59″N 88°08′32″E	Bhita of Chand Sadagar More images
N-WB-85	Chamkati Masjid	Gaur		Malda	24°52′13″N 88°08′09″E	Chamkati Masjid More images
N-WB-86	Chika Masjid	Gaur		Malda	24°52′04″N 88°07′53″E	Chika Masjid More images
N-WB-87	Dakhil Darwaza	Gaur		Malda	24°52′44″N 88°07′30″E	Dakhil Darwaza More images
N-WB-88	Firoz Minar	Gaur		Malda	24°52′25″N 88°07′49″E	Firoz Minar More images
N-WB-89	Gumti Gateway	Gaur		Malda	24°52′04″N 88°07′56″E	Gumti Gateway More images
N-WB-90	Gunmant Mosque	Gaur		Malda	24°51′05″N 88°07′53″E	Gunmant Mosque More images
N-WB-91	Kotwali Darwaja	Gaur		Malda	24°50′34″N 88°08′28″E	Kotwali Darwaja More images
N-WB-92	Lottan Masjid	Gaur		Malda	24°51′18″N 88°08′22″E	Lottan Masjid More images
N-WB-93	Lukachuri Gateway	Gaur		Malda	24°52′07″N 88°07′55″E	Lukachuri Gateway More images
N-WB-94	Qadam Rasul Mosque	Gaur		Malda	24°52′09″N 88°07′54″E	Qadam Rasul Mosque More images
N-WB-95	Tomb of Fateh Khan	Gaur		Malda	24°52′09″N 88°07′54″E	Tomb of Fateh Khan More images
N-WB-96	Tantipara Masjid	Gaur		Malda	24°51′39″N 88°08′13″E	Tantipara Masjid More images
N-WB-97	Two tombs in front of Tantipura Masjid	Gaur		Malda	24°51′38″N 88°08′15″E	Two tombs in front of Tantipura Masjid More images
N-WB-98	Two stone pillars	Gaur		Malda	24°54′35″N 88°08′00″E	Two stone pillars More images
N-WB-99	Tower	Nimasarai		Malda	25°02′22″N 88°07′52″E	Tower More images
N-WB-100	Eklakhi Mausoleum	Pandua		Malda	25°08′20″N 88°09′15″E	Eklakhi Mausoleum More images
N-WB-101	Qutub Shahi Masjid	Pandua		Malda	25°08′19″N 88°09′12″E	Qutub Shahi Masjid More images
N-WB-102	Dharmaraj Temple	Pathra		Paschim Medinipur	22°24′30″N 87°24′58″E	Dharmaraj Temple More images
N-WB-103	Temples of Bandyopadhyay Family	Pathra		Paschim Medinipur	22°24′43″N 87°25′10″E	Temples of Bandyopadhyay Family More images
N-WB-104	Sitala Temples	Pathra		Paschim Medinipur	22°24′30″N 87°25′13″E	Sitala Temples More images
N-WB-105	Navratna Temple Complex	Pathra		Paschim Medinipur	22°24′31″N 87°25′03″E	Navratna Temple Complex More images
N-WB-106	Kurumbera Fort	Gaganeswar		Paschim Medinipur	22°05′16″N 87°15′18″E	Kurumbera Fort More images
N-WB-107	John Pierce Tomb	Midnapore		Paschim Medinipur	22°24′38″N 87°18′49″E	John Pierce Tomb More images
N-WB-108	Tomb of Azimunnisha Begum daughter of Murshid Quli Khan	Azimnagar		Murshidabad	24°11′54″N 88°15′54″E	Tomb of Azimunnisha Begum daughter of Murshid Quli Khan More images
N-WB-109	Residency Cemetery also known as ‘Station Burial ground’	Babulbona Beharampore		Murshidabad	24°05′47″N 88°15′50″E	Residency Cemetery also known as ‘Station Burial ground’ More images
N-WB-110	Bhavaniswar Mandir	Baranagar		Murshidabad	24°15′07″N 88°14′36″E	Bhavaniswar Mandir More images
N-WB-111	Char Bangla group of four Siva Mandirs	Baranagar		Murshidabad	24°15′05″N 88°14′38″E	Char Bangla group of four Siva Mandirs More images
N-WB-112	Tomb of Mir Madan	Faridpur		Murshidabad	23°50′49″N 88°13′54″E	Tomb of Mir Madan More images
N-WB-113	Dutch Cemetery	Kalikapur		Murshidabad	24°07′25″N 88°15′59″E	Dutch Cemetery More images
N-WB-114	Old English Cemetery or Old Residency Burial Ground	Cossimbazar		Murshidabad	24°07′25″N 88°16′34″E	Upload Photo
N-WB-115	Kherur Mosque	Kheraul		Murshidabad	24°20′59″N 88°04′25″E	Kherur Mosque More images
N-WB-116	Tomb of Alivardi Khan & the tomb of Seraj-ud-daullah	Khosbag		Murshidabad	24°09′39″N 88°15′30″E	Tomb of Alivardi Khan & the tomb of Seraj-ud-daullah More images
N-WB-117	Mound known as Barkona Deul Mound	Panchthupi		Murshidabad		Upload Photo
N-WB-118	Mounds known as the Devil's Mound and Raja Karna's Palace	Rangamati		Murshidabad	24°01′49″N 88°11′27″E	Mounds known as the Devil's Mound and Raja Karna's Palace More images
N-WB-119	Tomb of Sujauddin	Roshnibagh		Murshidabad	24°11′09″N 88°15′51″E	Tomb of Sujauddin
N-WB-120	Tomb and Mosque of Murhsid Kuli Khan (also: Katra Masjid)	Sabz Katra		Murshidabad	24°11′05″N 88°17′17″E	Tomb and Mosque of Murhsid Kuli Khan (also: Katra Masjid) More images
N-WB-121	Jahan Kosha Cannon	Topkhana Murshidabad		Murshidabad	24°10′39″N 88°17′36″E	Jahan Kosha Cannon More images
N-WB-122	Hazarduari Palace and Imambara (Murshidabad)	Killa Nizamat		Murshidabad	24°11′11″N 88°16′08″E	Hazarduari Palace and Imambara (Murshidabad) More images
N-WB-123	South Gate, Kella Nezamat	Lalbag		Murshidabad	24°10′50″N 88°16′11″E	South Gate, Kella Nezamat More images
N-WB-124	Imambara, Kella Nezamat	Lalbag		Murshidabad	24°11′18″N 88°16′07″E	Imambara, Kella Nezamat More images
N-WB-125	White Mosque, Kella Nezamat (also: Sada Masjid)	Lalbag		Murshidabad	24°11′15″N 88°16′06″E	White Mosque, Kella Nezamat (also: Sada Masjid) More images
N-WB-126	Yellow Mosque, Kella Nezamat	Lalbag		Murshidabad	24°11′12″N 88°16′04″E	Yellow Mosque, Kella Nezamat More images
N-WB-127	Tripolia Gate, Kella Nizamat	Lalbag		Murshidabad	24°11′09″N 88°16′16″E	Tripolia Gate, Kella Nizamat More images
N-WB-128	Nil Kuthi Mound	Mouza Chak, Chandpara		Mursidabad	24°01′12″N 88°11′31″E	Upload Photo
N-WB-129	Motijheel Jama Mosque	Murshidabad		Mursidabad	24°09′42″N 88°16′32″E	Motijheel Jama Mosque More images
N-WB-130	Mound known as Bamanpukur Mound or Fort	Bamanpukur		Nadia	23°26′55″N 88°24′11″E	Mound known as Bamanpukur Mound or Fort More images
N-WB-131	Ruins of Fort	Bamanpukur		Nadia		Ruins of Fort
N-WB-132	Temple	Palpara		Nadia	23°03′31″N 88°31′01″E	Temple More images
N-WB-133	Tamluk Rajbari	Padumbasan, Tamluk		Purba Medinipur	22°17′52″N 87°55′17″E	Tamluk Rajbari More images
N-WB-134	Banda Deul	Banda		Purulia	23°36′03″N 86°33′52″E	Banda Deul More images

== See also ==
- List of Monuments of National Importance in India for other Monuments of National Importance in India
- List of State Protected Monuments in West Bengal
