= Madanmohanpur =

- Village
- Location in West Bengal, India Madanmohanpur (India)
- Coordinates: 23.3248°N 87.4161°E
- Country: India
- State: West Bengal
- District: Bankura

Population (2011)
  - Total: 1,059

Languages
  - Official: Bengali, English
- Time zone: UTC+5:30 (IST)
- PIN: 722207
- Telephone/STD code: 03243
- Lok Sabha constituency: Bishnupur
- Vidhan Sabha constituency: Sonamukhi
- Website: bankura.gov.in

Madanmohanpur (also referred to as Madanpur) is a village in the Sonamukhi CD block in the Bishnupur subdivision of the Bankura district in the state of West Bengal, India.

== Geography ==
Places in Bishnupur subdivision in Bankura district
M: Municipal town, CT: census town, R: rural/ urban centre, T: ancient/ temple centre
Owing to space constraints in the small map, the actual locations in a larger map may vary slightly

=== Location ===
Madanmohanpur is located at 23.3248°N 87.4161°E.

Note: The map alongside presents some of the notable locations in the subdivision. All places marked in the map are linked in the larger full screen map.

== Demographics ==
According to the 2011 Census of India, Madanmohanpur had a total population of 1,059, of which 540 (51%) were males and 519 (49%) were females. There were 156 persons in the age range of 0–6 years. The total number of literate persons in Madanmohanpur was 564 (62.46% of the population over 6 years).

== Education ==
Madanmohanpur Primary School is a Bengali-medium coeducational institution established in 1961. It has facilities for teaching from class I to class IV. The school has a library with 336 books.

== Culture ==
David J. McCutchion mentions the Shyama-Sundara temple as a brick built largely plain ek-ratna with a ridged rekha tower.

The Archaeological Survey of India, Kolkata Circle describes the Shyam Sundar temple as "a brick-built Temple with a sikhara of north Indian type on top. It was built in c.17th-18th century AD."

The Shyam Sundar Temple is included in the List of Monuments of National Importance in West Bengal by the Archaeological Survey of India (serial no. N-WB-33).

== Notable Person ==
Shailen Dutta, teacher and social reformer.
