= Residency Cemetery, Babulbona =

- An ASI Listed Monument
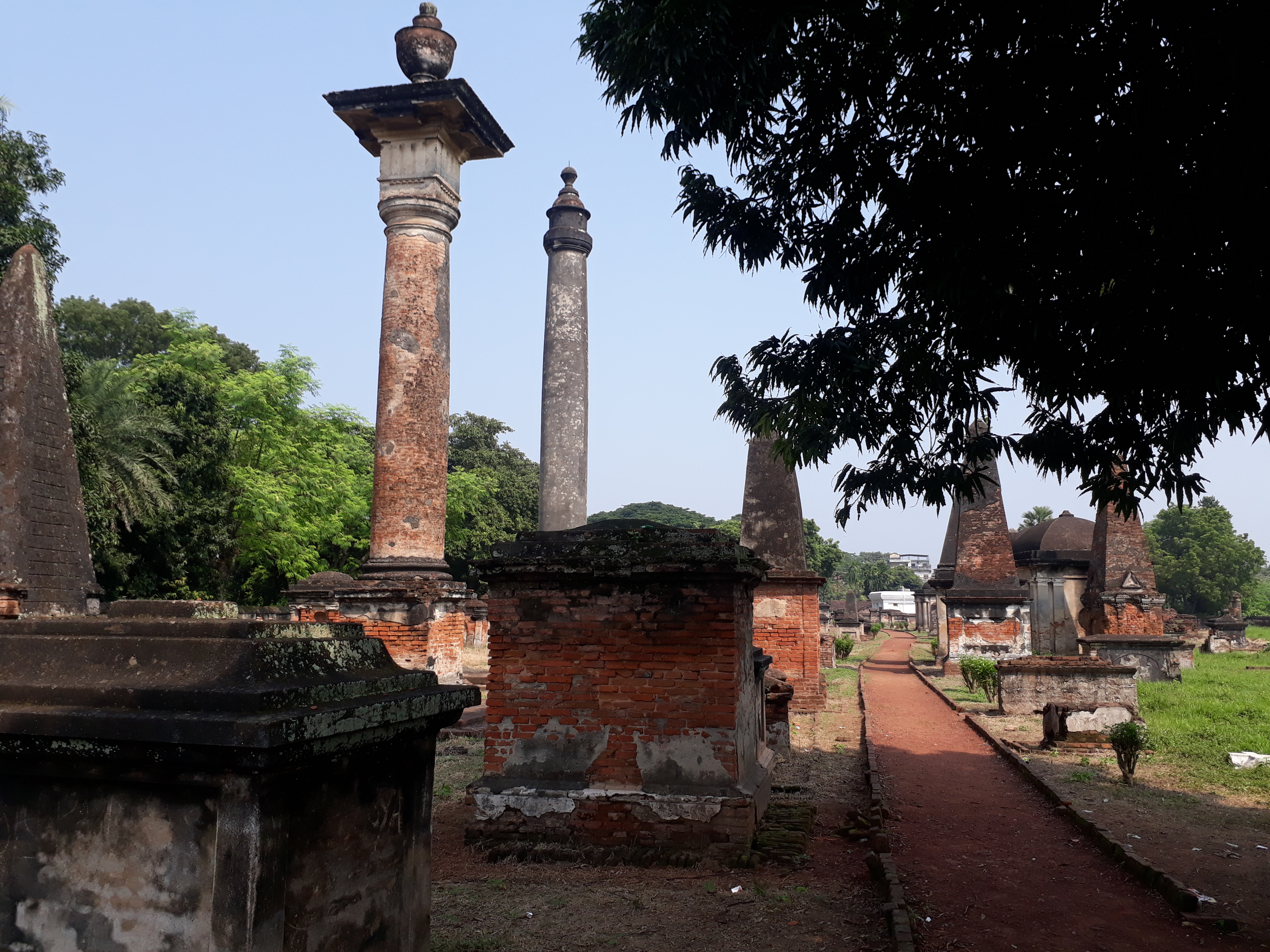
- Interactive map of Residency Cemetery, Babulbona

Details
- Location: Baharampur, West Bengal
- Country: India
- Coordinates: 24.096828°N 88.264145°E
- Owned by: ASI

Residency Cemetery, Babulbona also known as Station Burial ground or Babulbona Cemetery is a heritage Christian cemetery situated at Babulbona, Baharampur, Murshidabad district in the Indian state of West Bengal.

According to the Archaeological Survey of India, as mentioned in the List of Monuments of National Importance in West Bengal, the Residency Cemetery also known as 'Station Burial Ground' is an ASI Listed Monument.

== History ==
Berhampore or Baharampur was fortified in 1757 by the East India Company, after the Battle of Plassey in June 1757, and it continued as a cantonment until 1870. Many important British residents and military personnel of East India Company, who lived in Berhampore are buried in this cemetery. There are the graves of many European Residents amongst whom most famous were Captain James Skinner, George Thomas, Henry Creighton. There are a number of epitaphs attached to the tombs and monuments of 18th and 19th century. Presently this is a Monument of National Importance in West Bengal under the maintenance of Archaeological Survey of India (ASI).

== Gallery ==
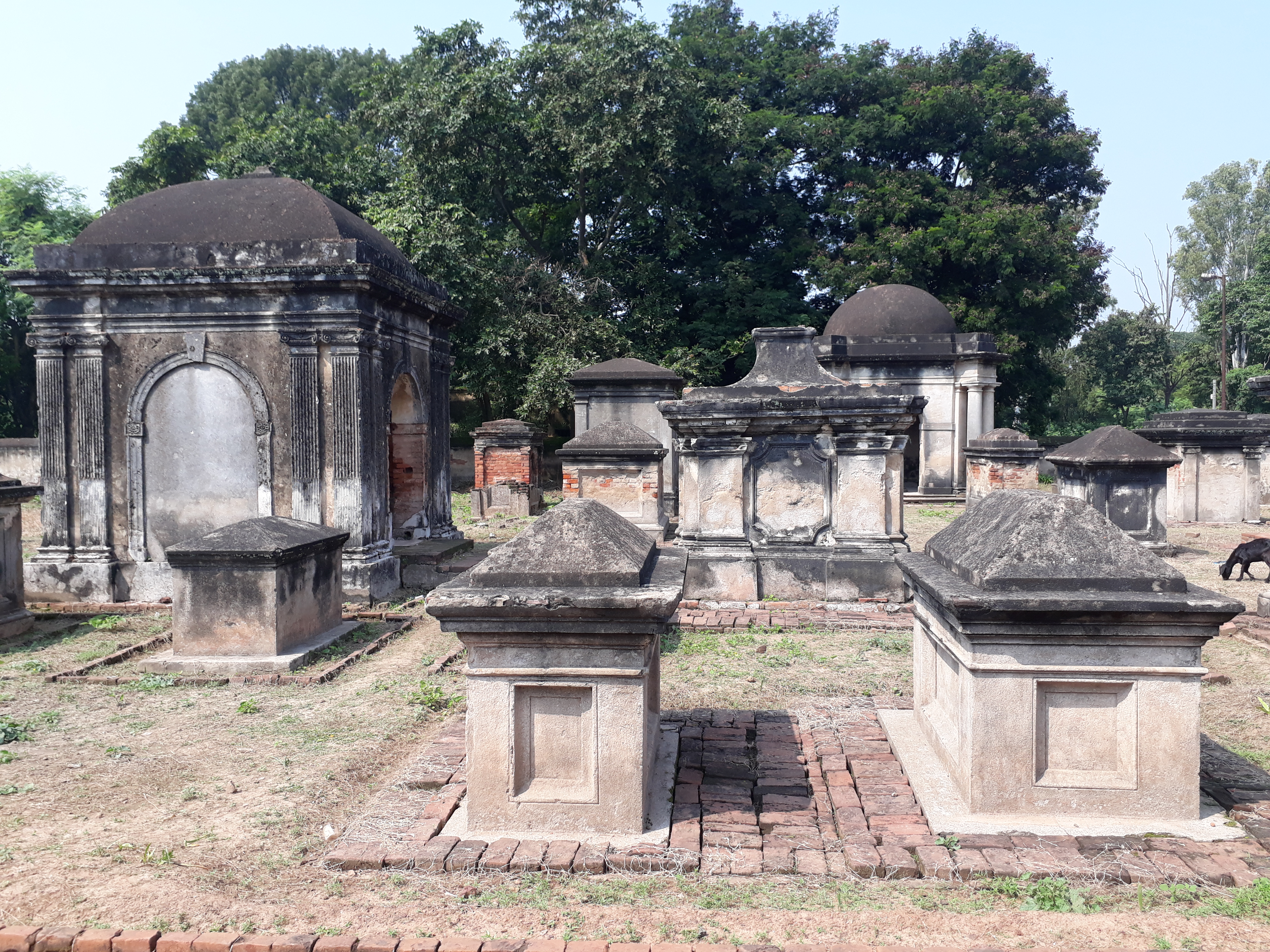

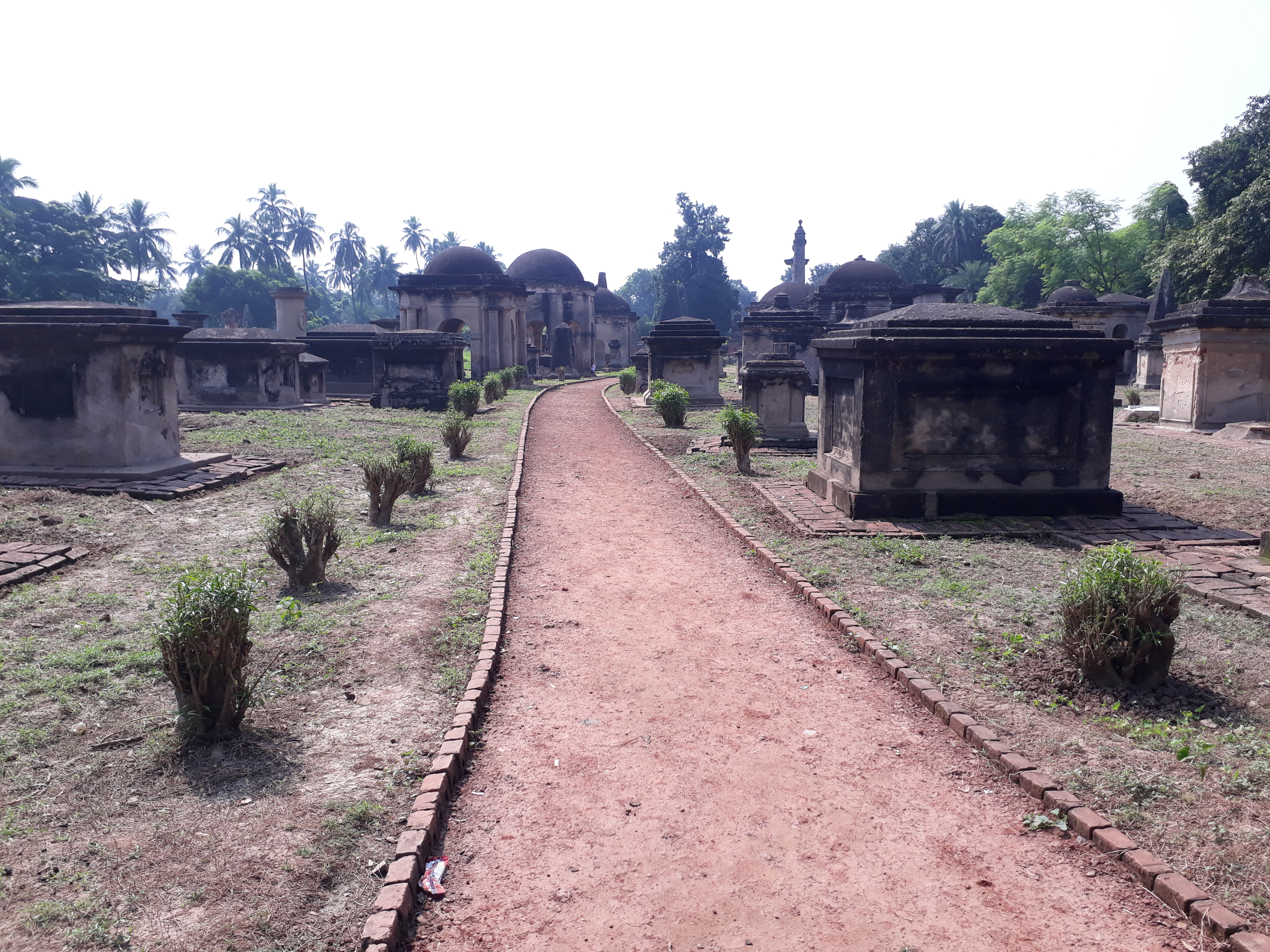

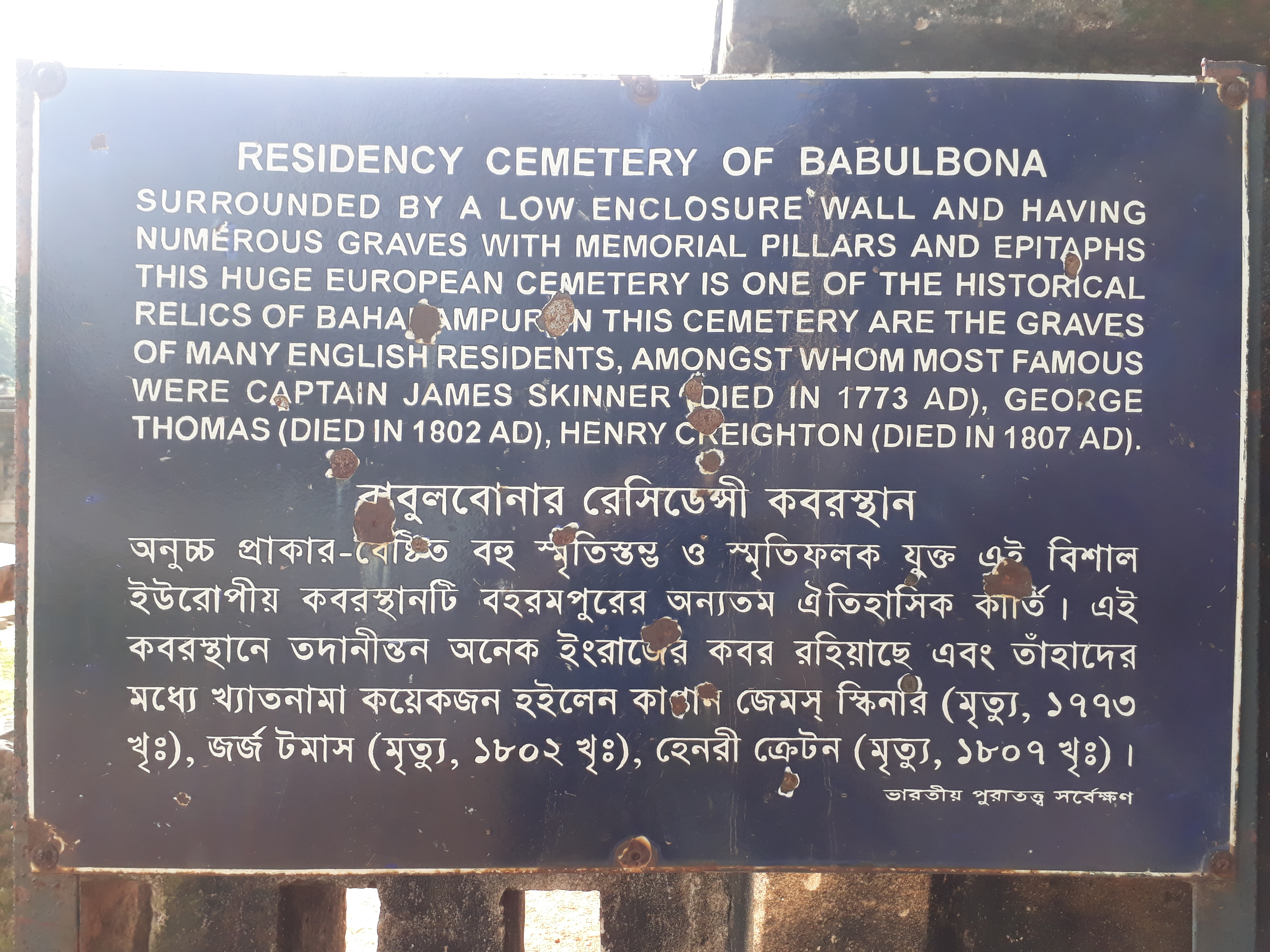

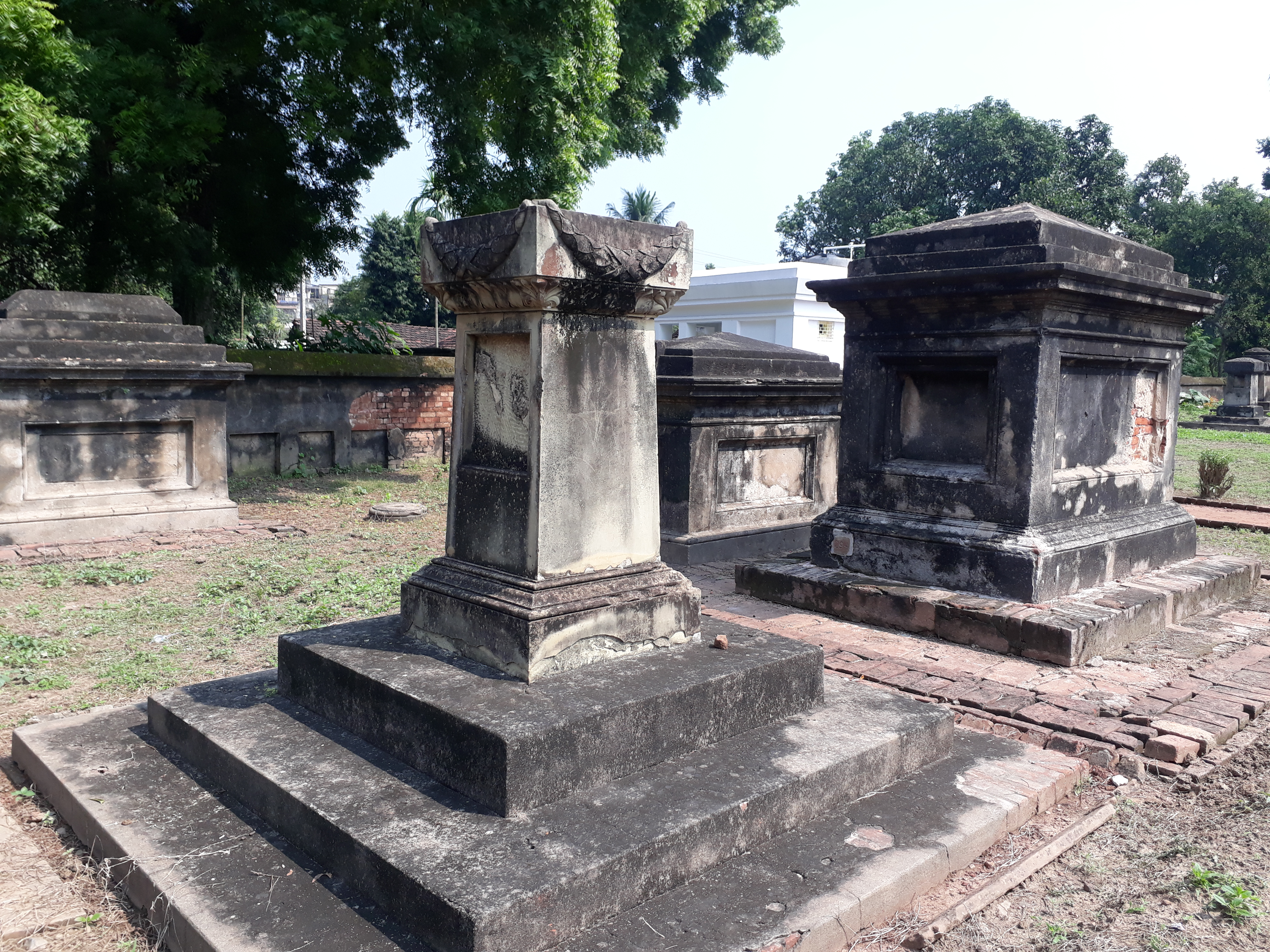

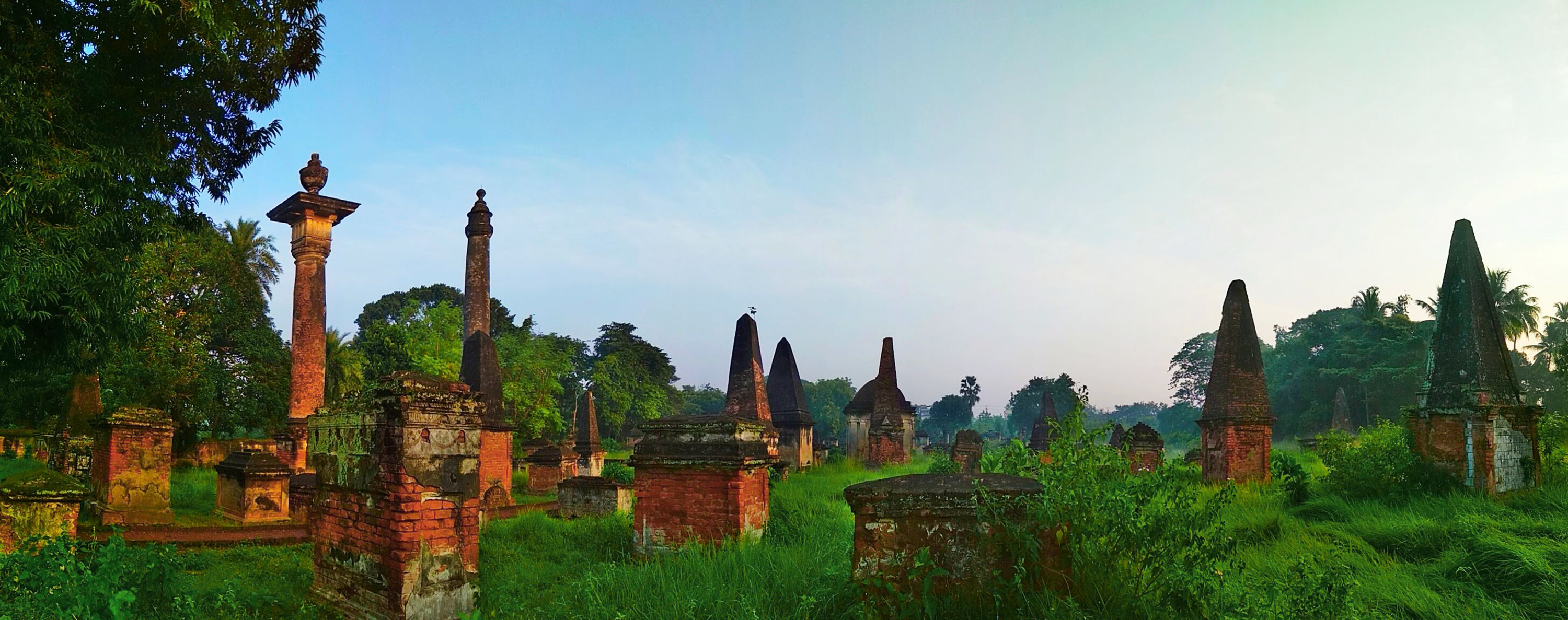
