= Kherur Mosque =

Mosque in Kherur, Murshidabad, West Bengal, India

- খেরুর মসজিদ
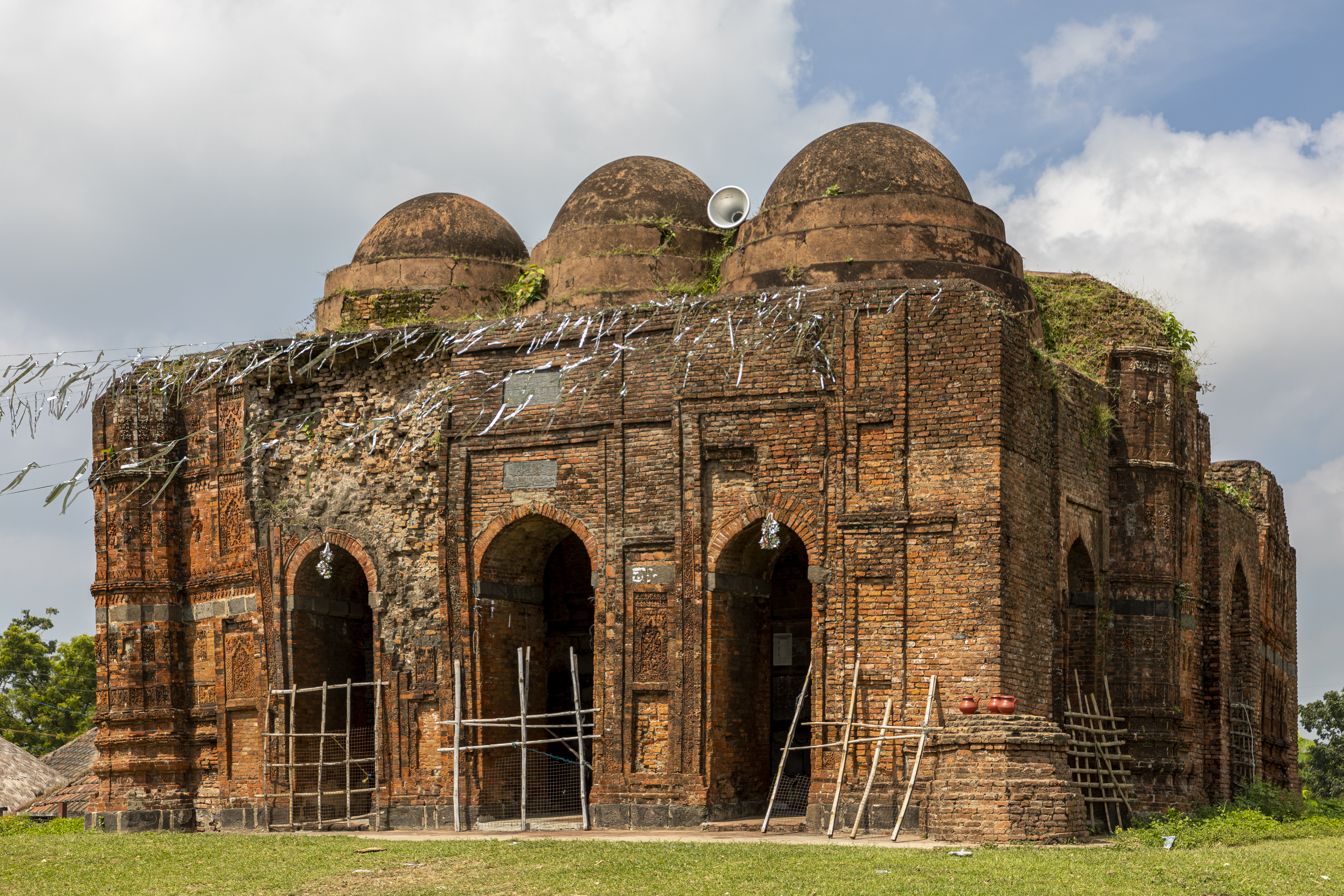
- The former mosque, in 2016

- Location of the former mosque in West Bengal

Religion
- Affiliation: Islam (former)
- Ecclesiastical or organisational status: Mosque (former)
- Status: Inactive (as a mosque); Partial ruinous state

Location
- Location: Kherur, Murshidabad district, West Bengal
- Country: India
- Administration: Archaeological Survey of India
- Coordinates: 24°20′57″N 88°04′23″E

Architecture
- Type: Mosque architecture
- Style: Indo-Islamic
- Founder: Rafa’t Khan
- Completed: 1495; 531 years ago

Specifications
- Dome: Five (estimate)
- Minaret: Four (since destroyed)
- Site area: 0.81 ha (2 acres)
- Materials: Bricks

Monument of National Importance
- Official name: Kherur Mosque
- Reference no.: N-WB-115

The Kherur Mosque (Bengali: খেরুর মসজিদ), also known as the Kheraul Mosque, is a former mosque in a partially ruinous state, located at Kherur in the Sagardighi CD block in the Jangipur subdivision of Murshidabad district, in the state of West Bengal, India.

The mosque is a Monument of National Importance, and is managed by the Archaeological Survey of India.

== History ==
The mosque was built by Rafa’t Khan in 1495 CE, during the reign of Alauddin Hussain Shah.

== Architecture ==
The brick-built mosque has a square prayer chamber with a verandah. Rectangular in shape, it is spread over 0.81 hectares (2 acres).

Amitabha Gupta, a photographer, wrote:

This brick-built Mosque at Kheraul alias Kherur with a single-domed square prayer chamber and a triple-domed verandah on the front with four minarets at four corners was erected by Rafa't Khan in 1495 CE during the reign of Alaud-Din Husain Shah on the basis of two inscriptions on the mosque. The hemispherical dome of the main prayer chamber fell down in the earthquake of 1897. The mosque is constructed entirely of brick without any stone facing. This mosque at Kheraul is unique because of its terracotta decorations on its wall. Only a handful of mosques have such decorations on their walls and they predate the famous terracotta temples of Bengal which were constructed between 17th to 19th century.

== Gallery ==
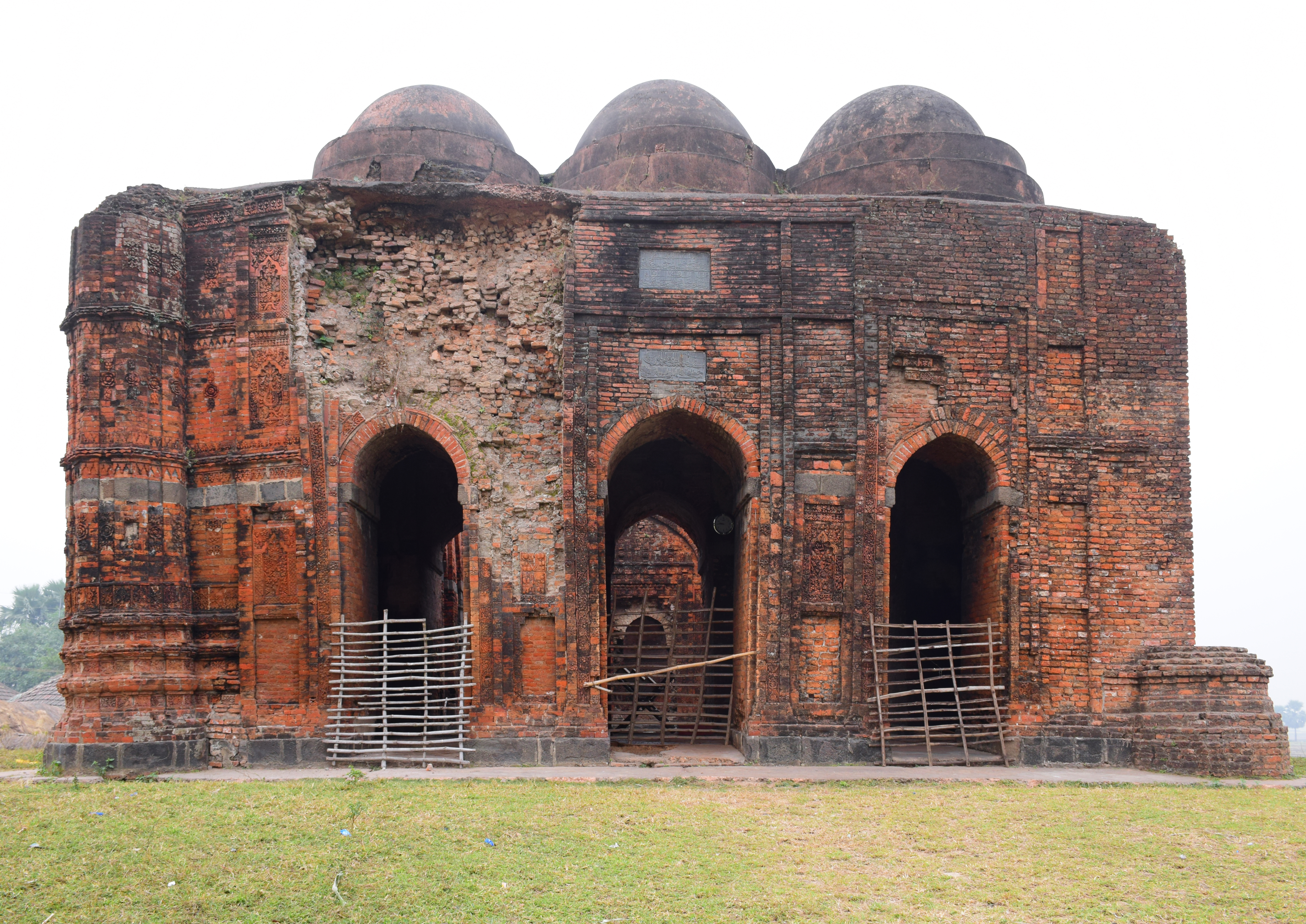

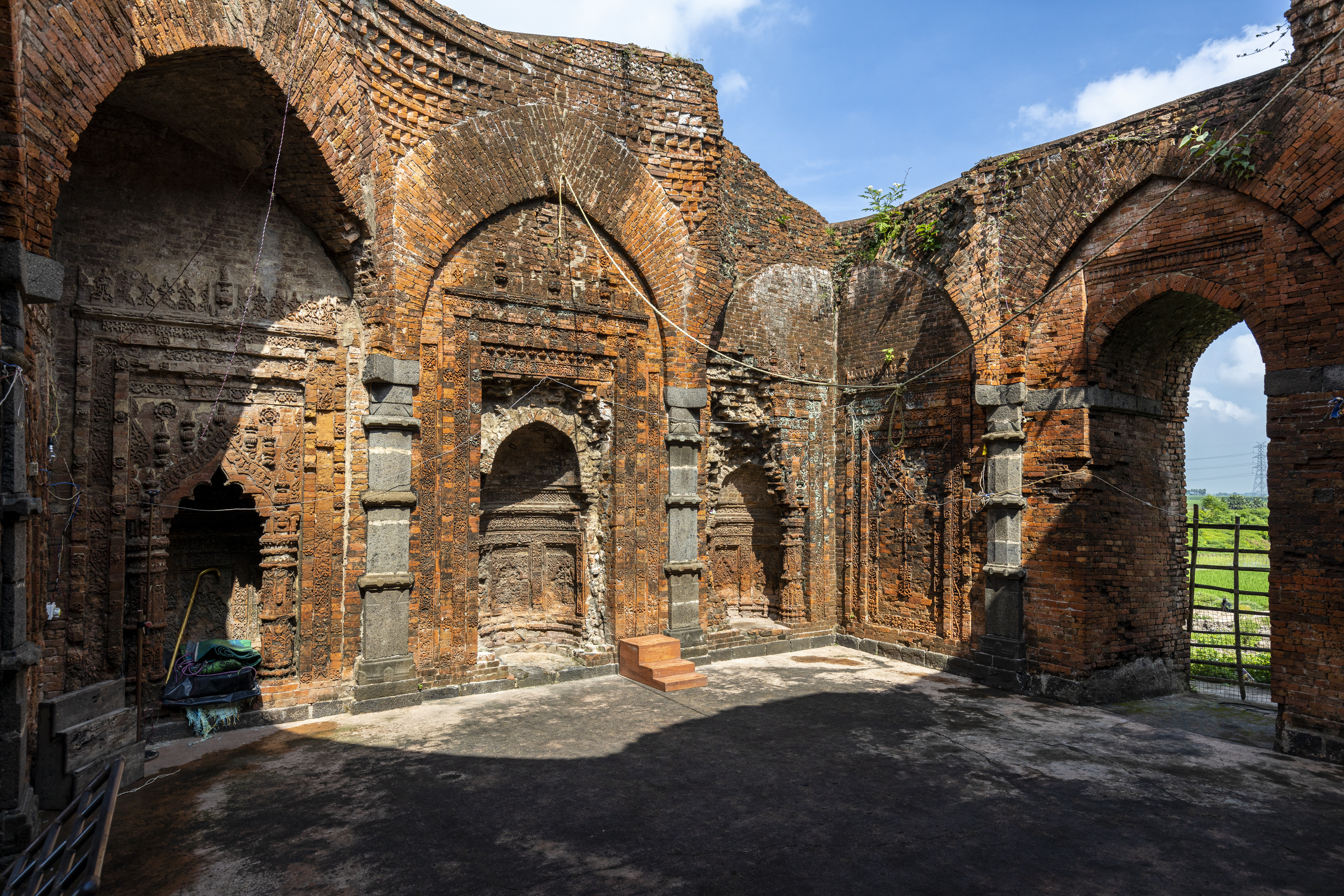

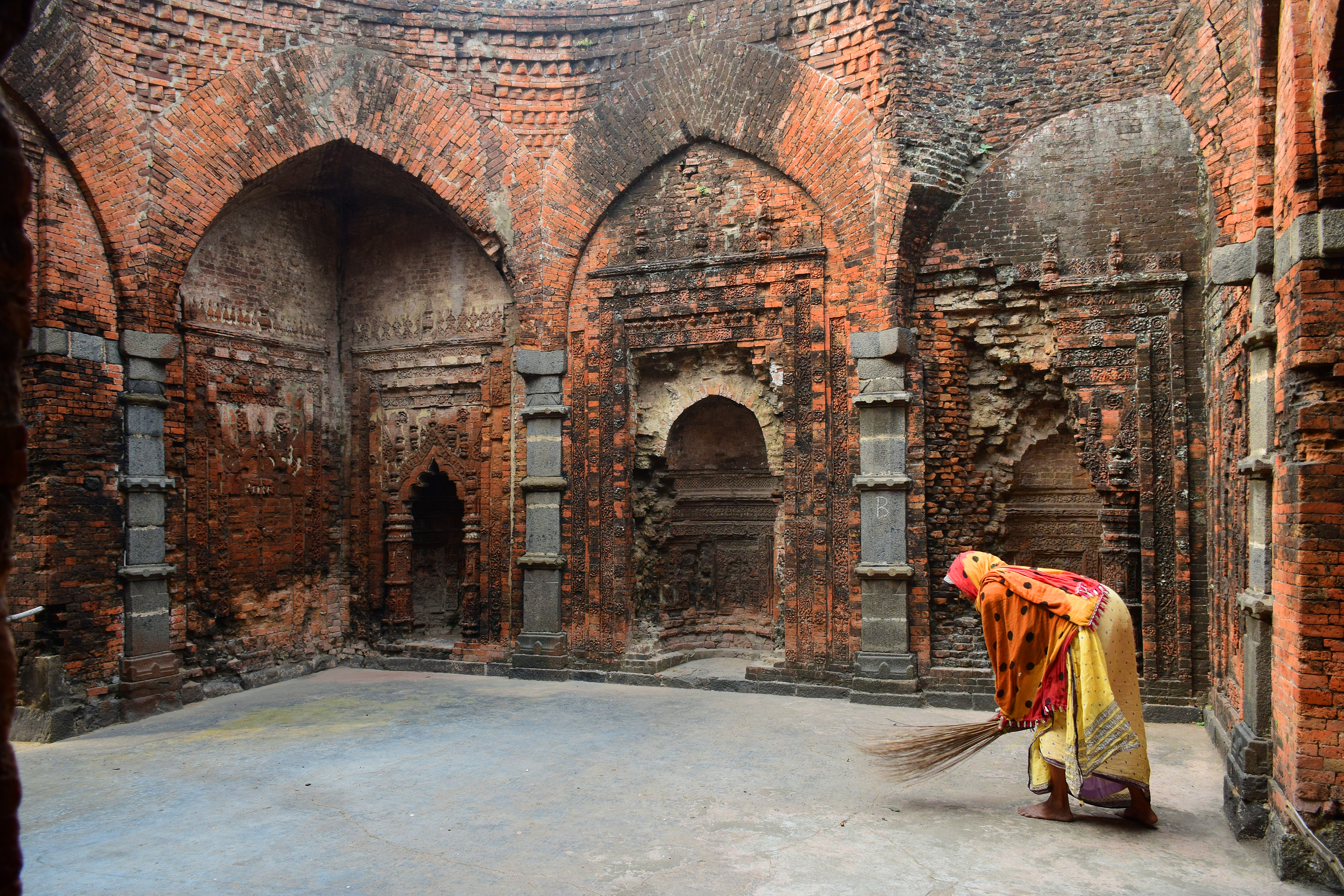

== See also ==
- Islam in India
- List of mosques in India
