= Bhavaniswar Mandir =

Temple in Murshidabad district

- An ASI Listed Monument
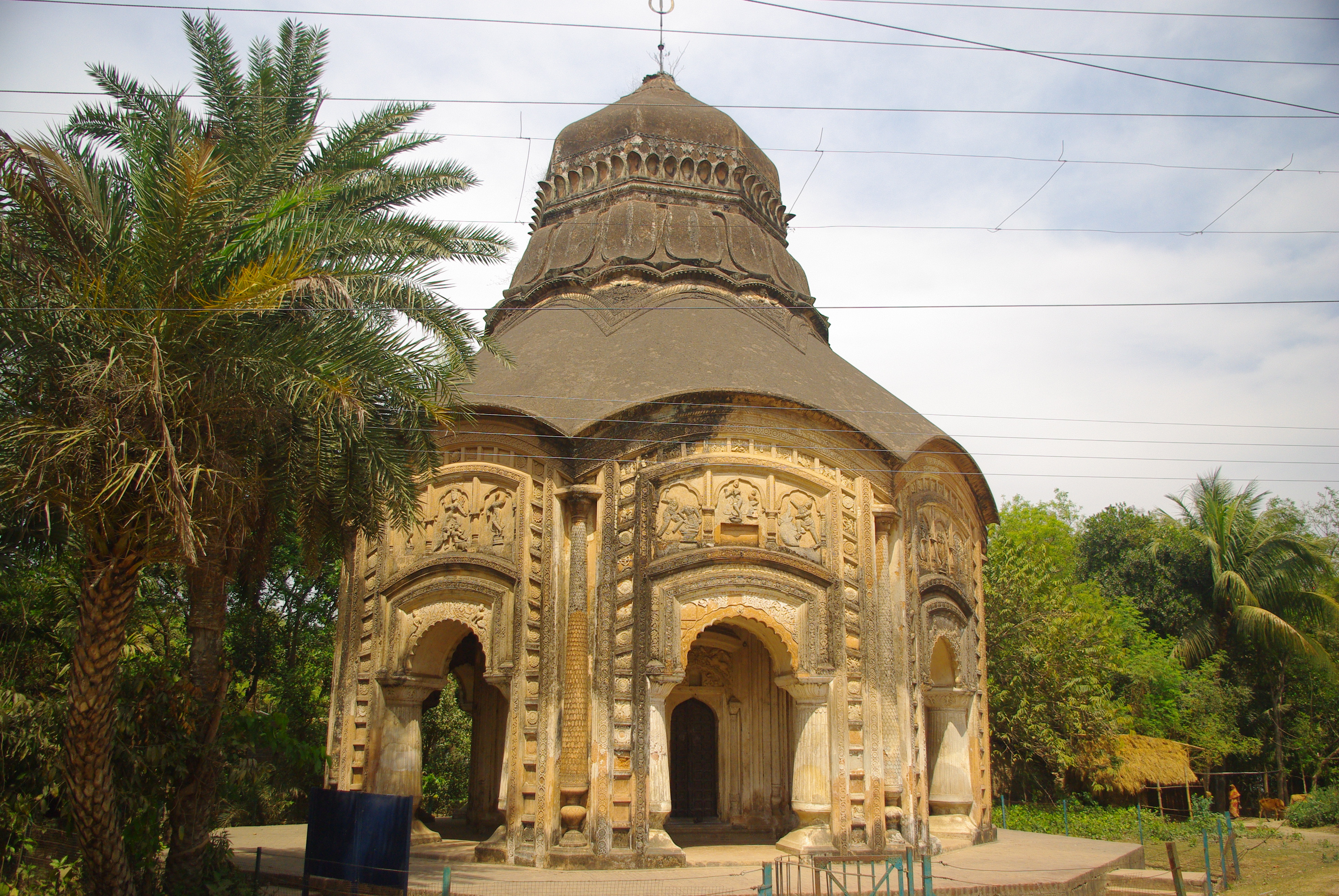
- Bhavaniswar Mandir

- Location within West Bengal Location within India

Religion
- Affiliation: Hinduism

Location
- Location: Baranagar; Murshidabad
- State: West Bengal
- Country: India
- Interactive map of Bhavaniswar Mandir
- Coordinates: 24.2528°N 88.2432°E

Architecture
- Completed: 1755

Bhavaniswar Mandir, is located at Baranagar in the Murshidabad-Jiaganj CD block in the Lalbag subdivision of Murshidabad district in the Indian state of West Bengal.

== Geography ==
Cities, towns and locations in the Lalbag and Domkal subdivisions, Murshidabad district
M: municipal town, CT: census town, R: rural/ urban centre, H: historical place
Owing to space constraints in the small map, the actual locations in a larger map may vary slightly

=== Location ===
The Bhavaniswar Mandir is located at 24.2528°N 88.2432°E.

== The temple ==
The Bhavaniswar Mandir at Baranagar was built in 1755 by Tarasundari, daughter of Rani Bhabani. It is the tallest lime and mortar temple at Baranagar. According to Shyamal Chaterji, researcher on Hindu iconography, the “inverted lotus-like dome of this 18 M tall temple and a circular corridor around the inner sanctum are note-worthy features. Human figures on the outer facade are average. The floral motifs on the outer wall of inner sanctum are excellent.”

Rani Bhabani (1716-1795) was wife of Raja Ramakanta, zamindar of Natore, in Rajshahi district, now in Bangladesh. After she became a widow at the age of 32, she ran her zamindari smoothly and earned fame for her philanthropic activities. “It is said that Rani Bhavani wanted to build 108 temples here at Baronagar on the shore of the Ganges to lift the status of this settlement to that of Varanasi. She stopped at 107; I have not heard any story about the reason.” Only a few of the temples are in good shape.

According to the List of Monuments of National Importance in West Bengal the Bhavaniswar Mandir is an ASI listed monument.

== Stucco decorations at Bhavaniswar Mandir ==
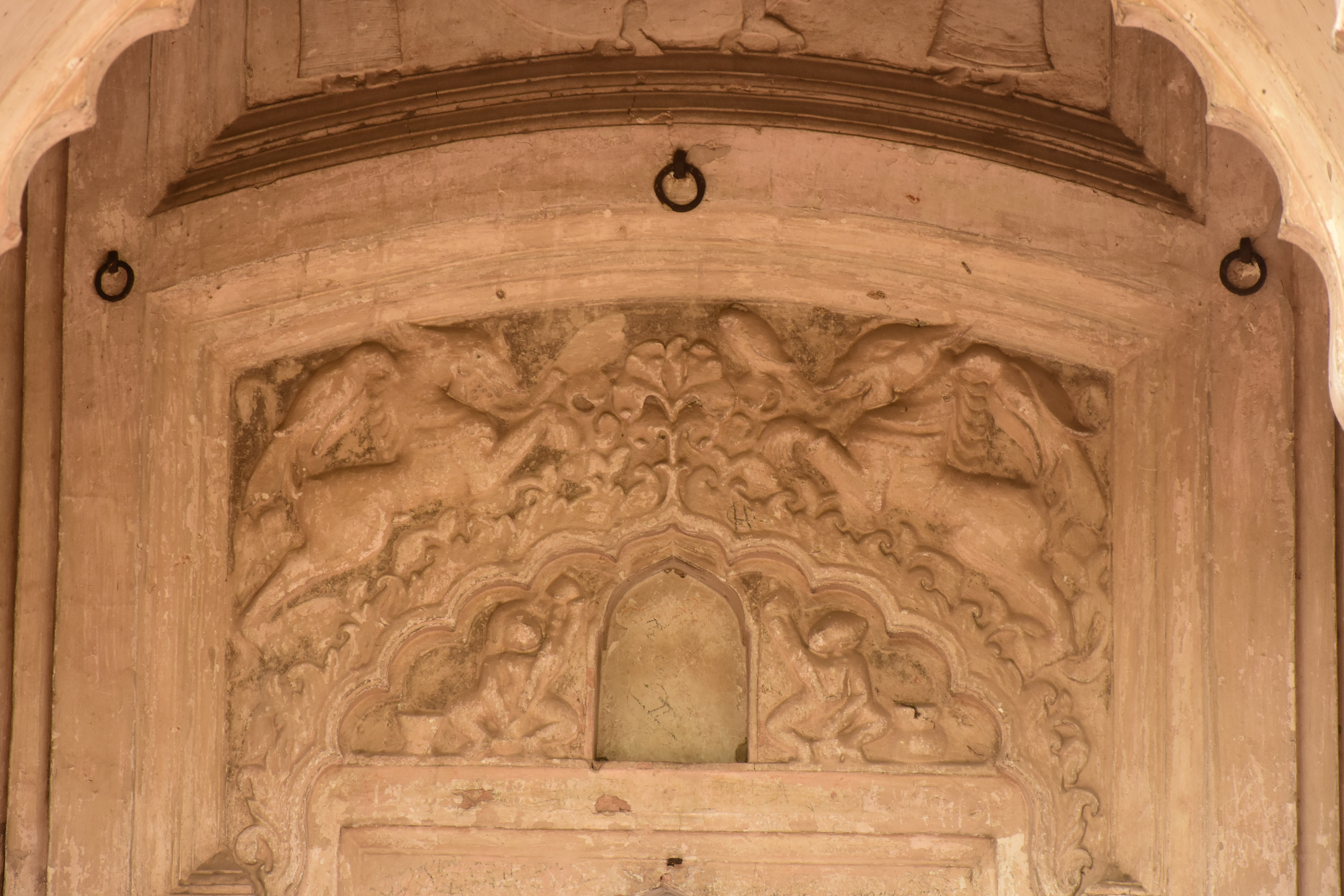

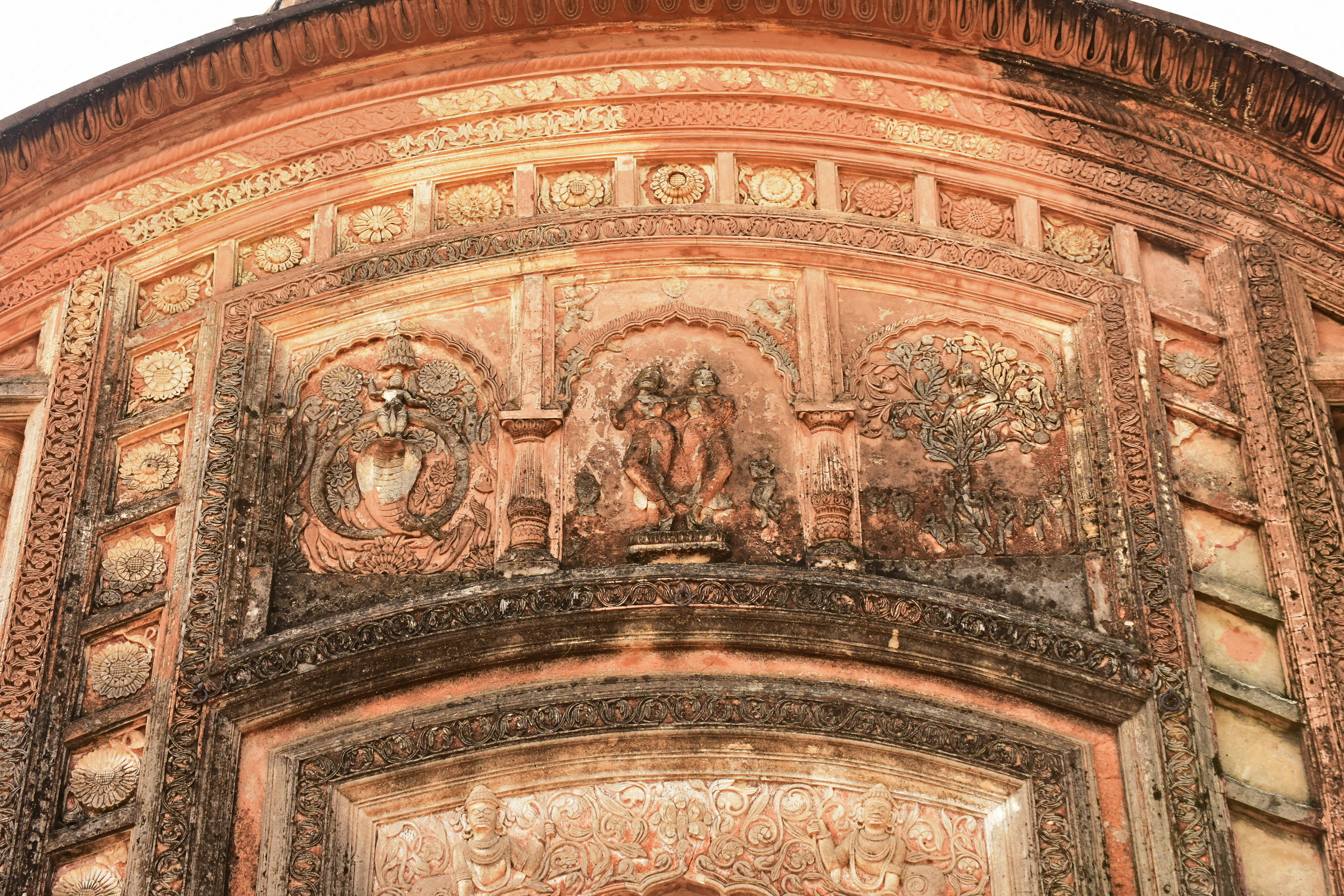

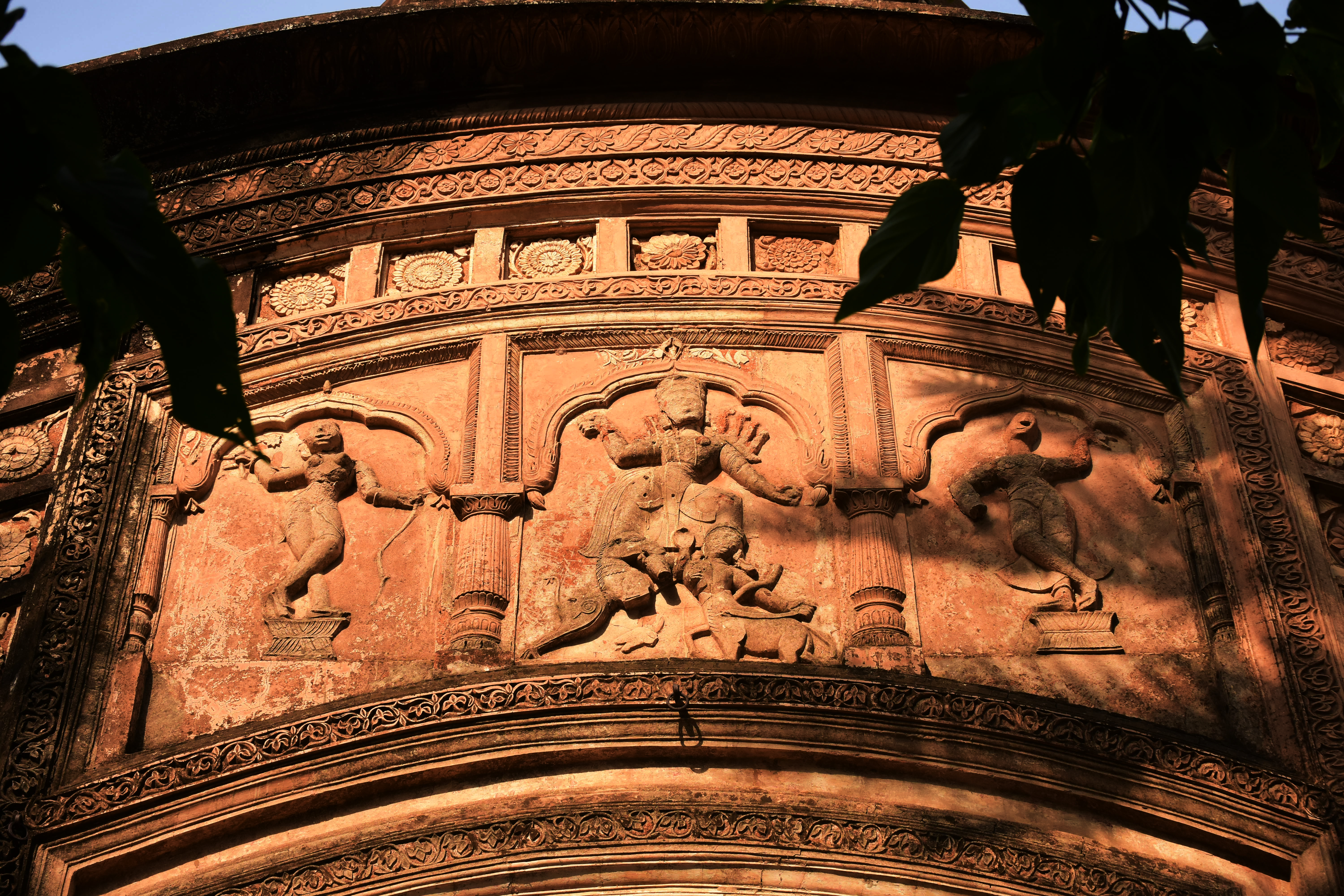

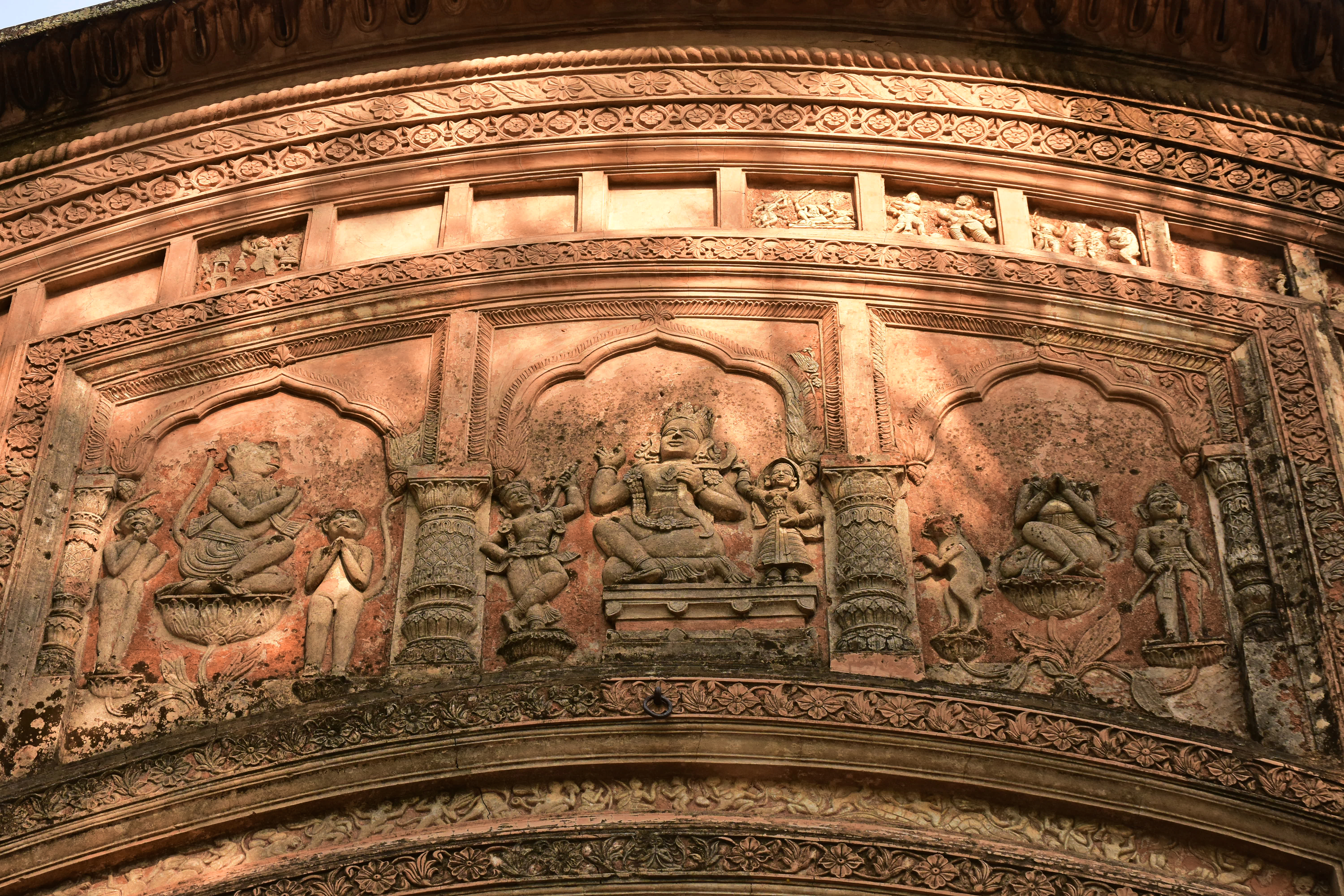
