= Yellow Mosque =

Mosque in Murshidabad, West Bengal, India

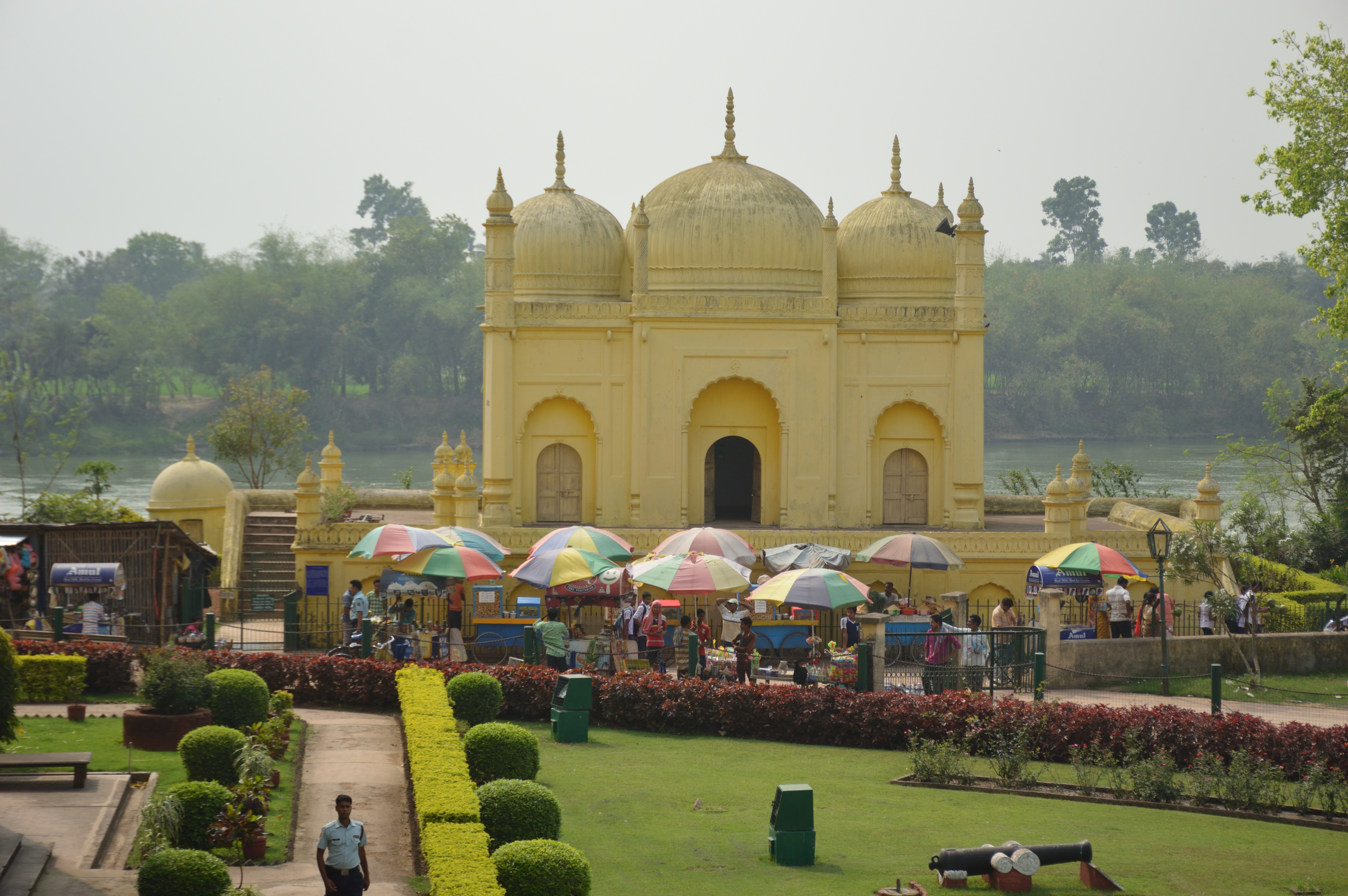
- The mosque, in 2017

- Location of the mosque in West Bengal

Religion
- Affiliation: Islam
- Ecclesiastical or organizational status: Mosque
- Status: Active

Location
- Location: Hazarduari Palace complex, Murshidabad, West Bengal
- Country: India
- Interactive map of Yellow Mosque
- Administration: Archaeological Survey of India
- Coordinates: 24°11′14″N 88°16′04″E

Architecture
- Type: Mosque architecture
- Style: Indo-Islamic
- Founder: Nawab Siraj ud-Daulah
- Completed: c. 1757
- Dome: Three

Monument of National Importance
- Official name: Yellow Mosque
- Reference no.: N-WB-126

The Yellow Mosque, also known as the Zurud Mosque, is a mosque located in the Hazarduari Palace complex at Murshidabad, in the state of West Bengal, India. The Yellow Mosque was built by Nawab Siraj ud-Daulah in 1756–57, in the Hazarduari Palace complex, on the banks of the Bhagirathi River.

The mosque is a Monument of National Importance, managed by the Archaeological Survey of India (ASI).

== Gallery ==
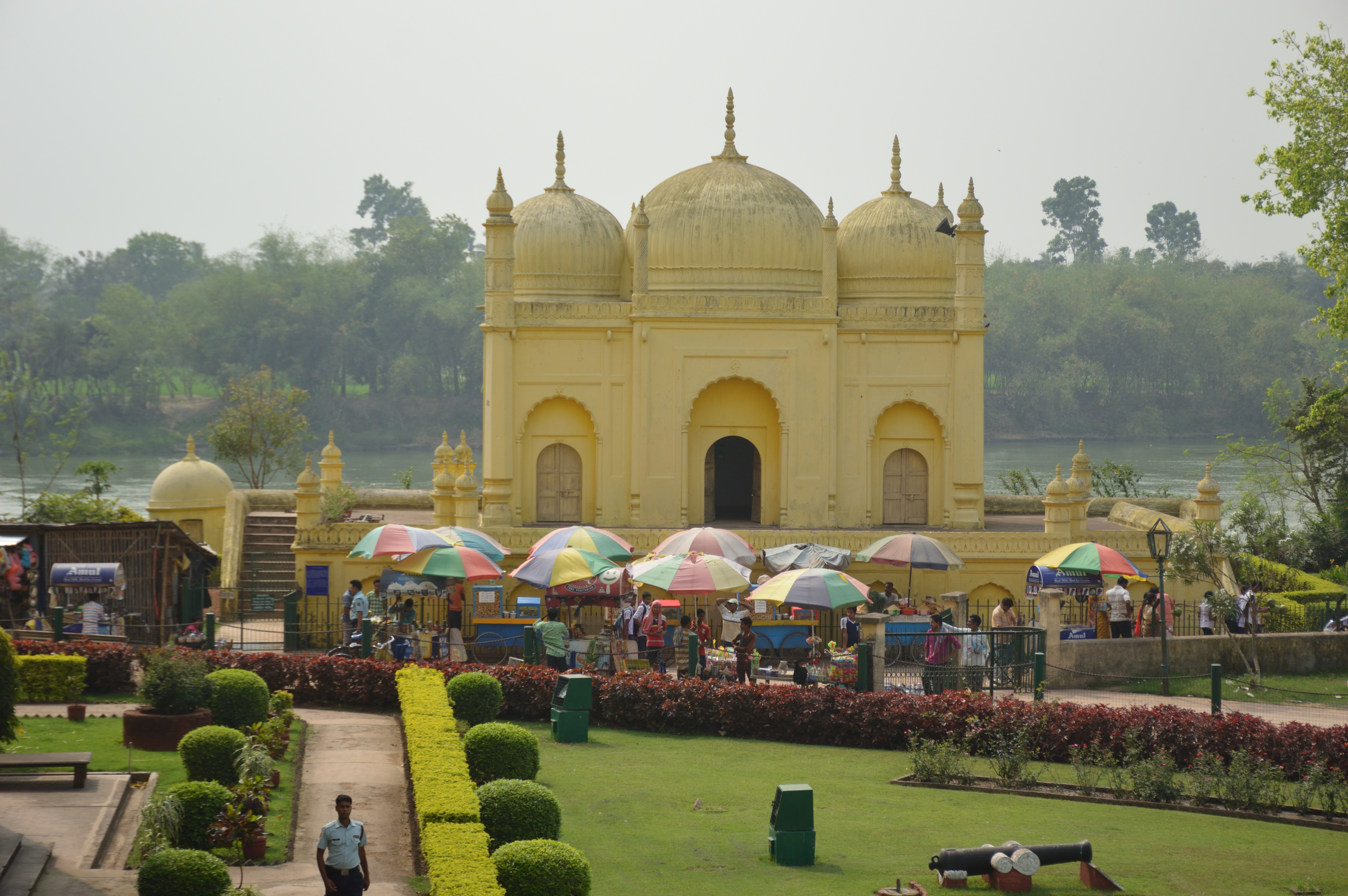

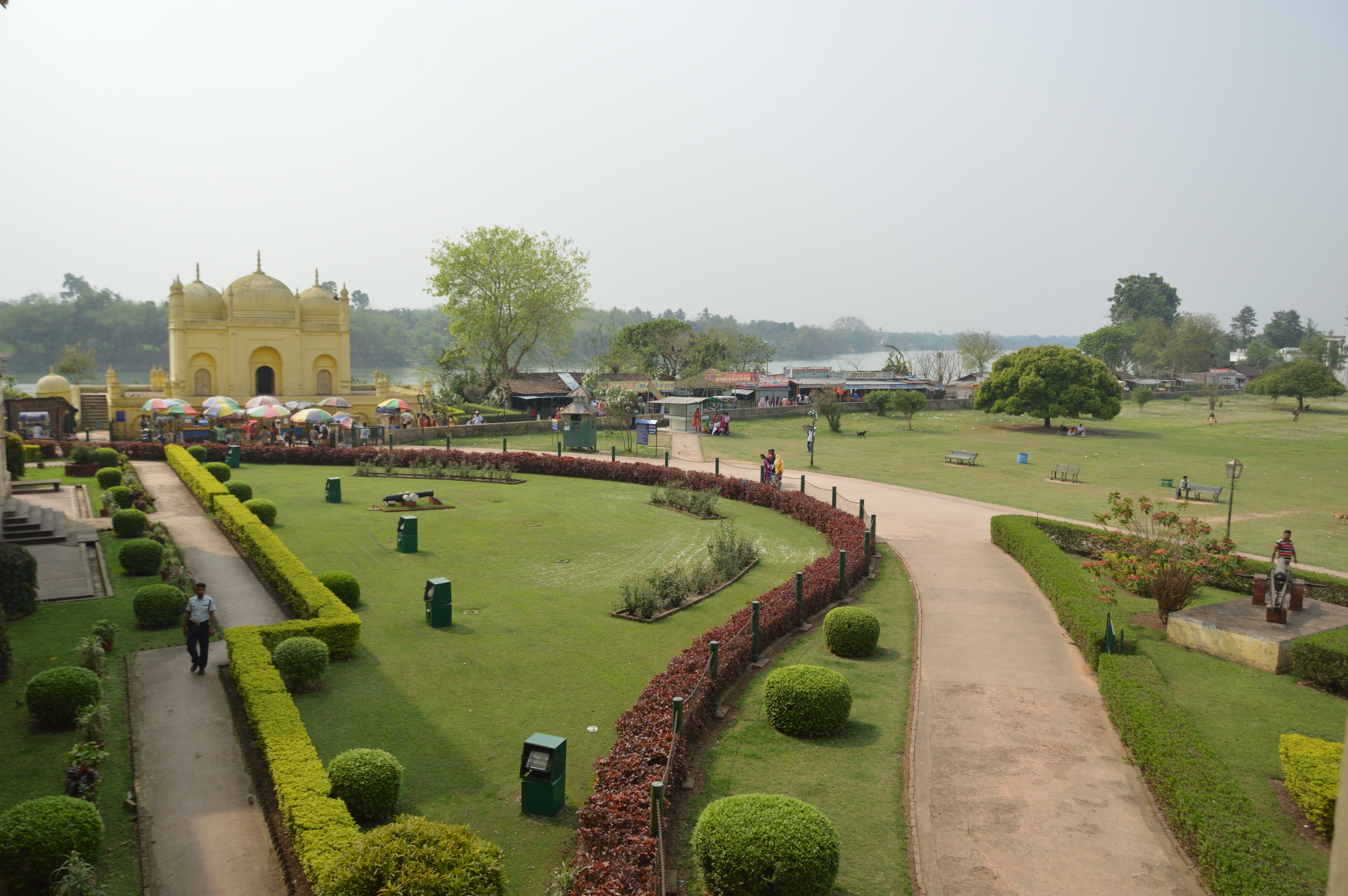

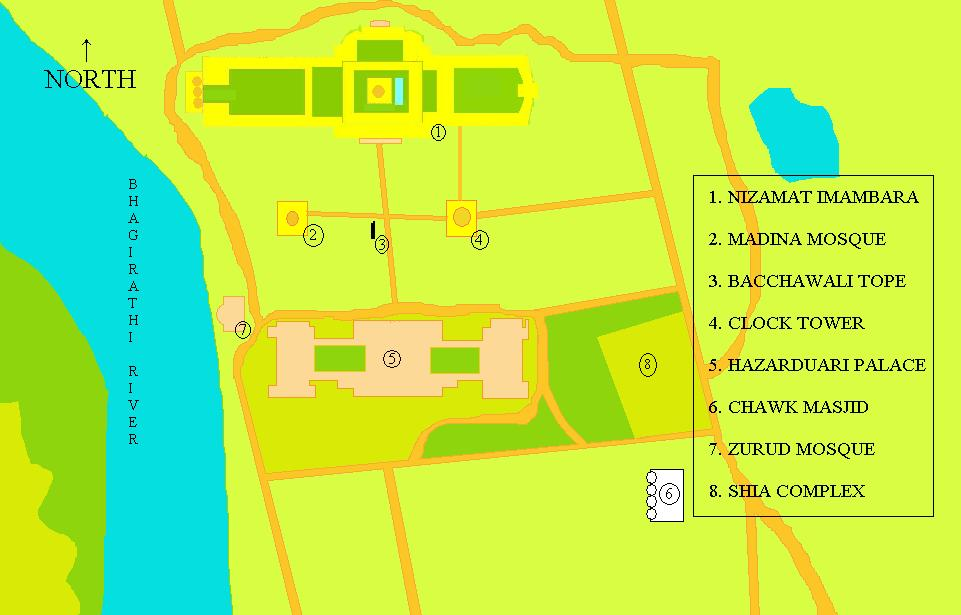
A map of the Nizamat Fort Campus, showing the Nizamat Imambara in yellow and other buildings surrounding it

== See also ==
- Islam in India
- List of mosques in India
- List of Monuments of National Importance in West Bengal
- Nawabs of Bengal and Murshidabad
