= Madan Gopal Temple =

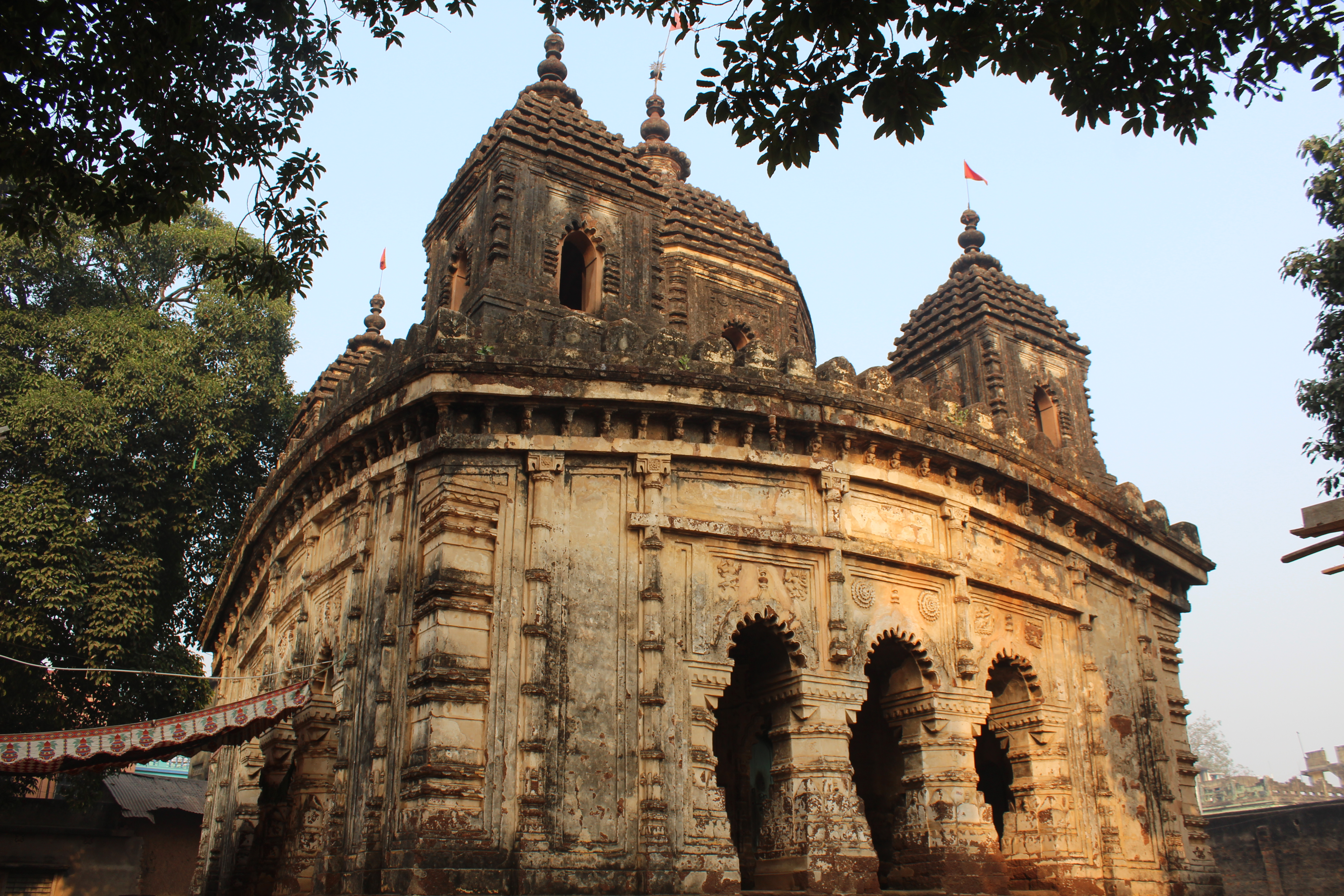

Religion
- Affiliation: Hinduism
- District: Bankura
- Deity: Madan Gopal

Location
- Location: Bishnupur
- State: West Bengal
- Country: India
- Geographic coordinates: 23°4′35.41″N 87°18′42.75″E

Architecture
- Type: Bengal temple architecture
- Style: Pancha-ratna style
- Founder: Churamoni(Siromoni/Siramani Devi), wife of Bir Singha
- Date established: 1665; 360 years ago

Specifications
- Length: 11.3 m (37 ft)
- Width: 11.3 m (37 ft)
- Height (max): 13.7 m (45 ft)
- Monument of National Importance
- Official name: Madan Gopal Temple
- Type: Cultural
- Reference no.: IN-WB-14

Madan Gopal Temple also known as Pancha-ratna temple, is a Krishna temple in Bishnupur in the Indian state of West Bengal. In this temple, the Hindu God Krishna is worshiped.

== History and architecture ==
According to the inscriptional plaque found in the temple, the temple was founded in 1665 by Churamoni (Siromoni/Siramani Devi), wife of Bir Singha II King of Mallabhum. The Temple is built in the Pancha-ratna temple architecture, which belongs to the ratna style developed in medieval Bengal.

The structure's layout is square-shaped, with each side being 11.3 meters wide and 13.7 meters tall. The structure has five sikharas superimposed upon a curved roof and the only Pancha-ratna temple built in laterite in Bishnupur. The tower placed at the centre is octagonal in shape, while the four towers at four corners are square in shape with stepped character of pida type. This temple is rather scantily decorated. Only some lotus ornamentations are found above the arches of the porch. Very sturdily built, this temple has a character of its own, quite different from the other big temples of Bishnupur.

Currently, it is preserved as one of the archaeological monuments by the Archaeological Survey of India.

== Gallery ==
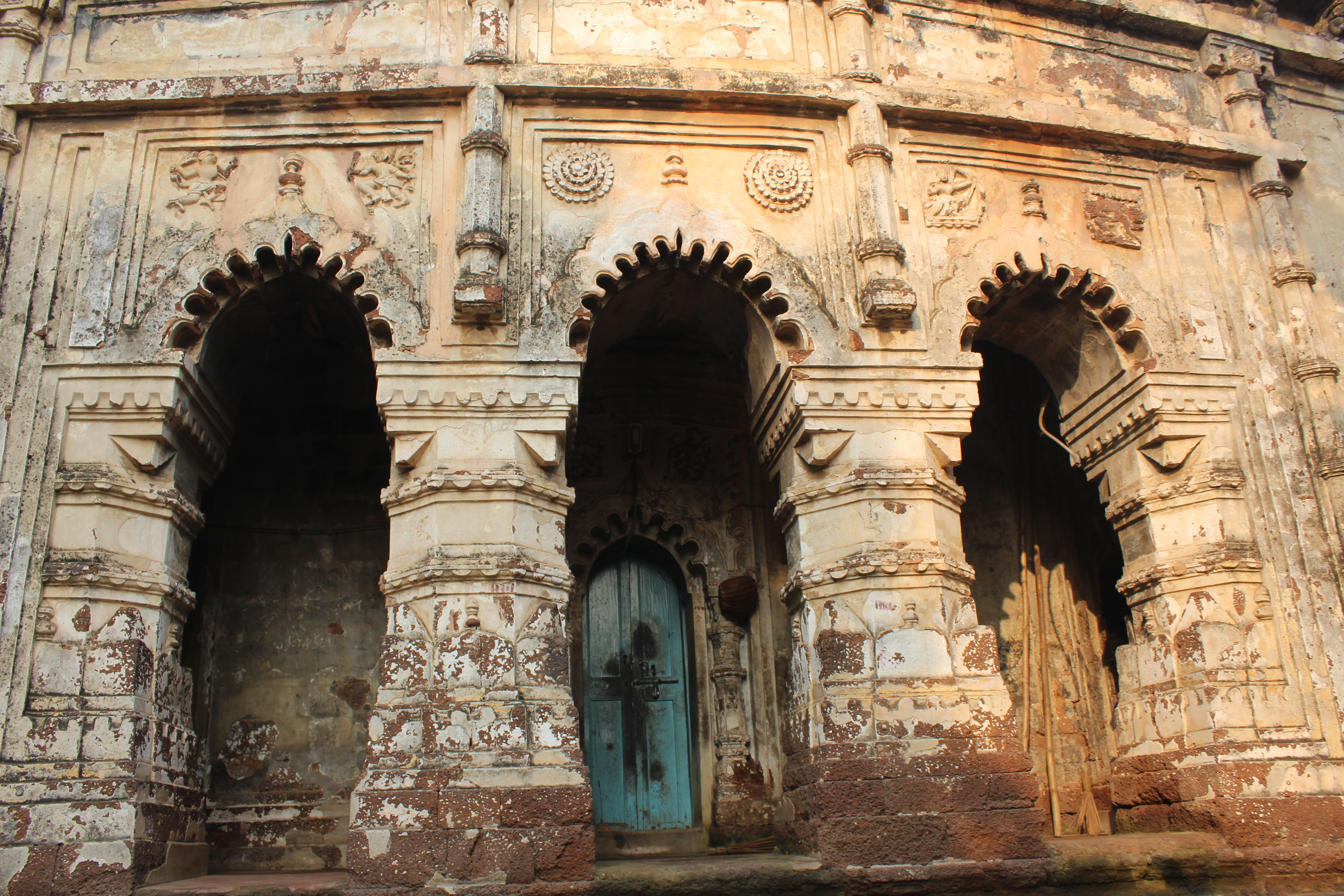

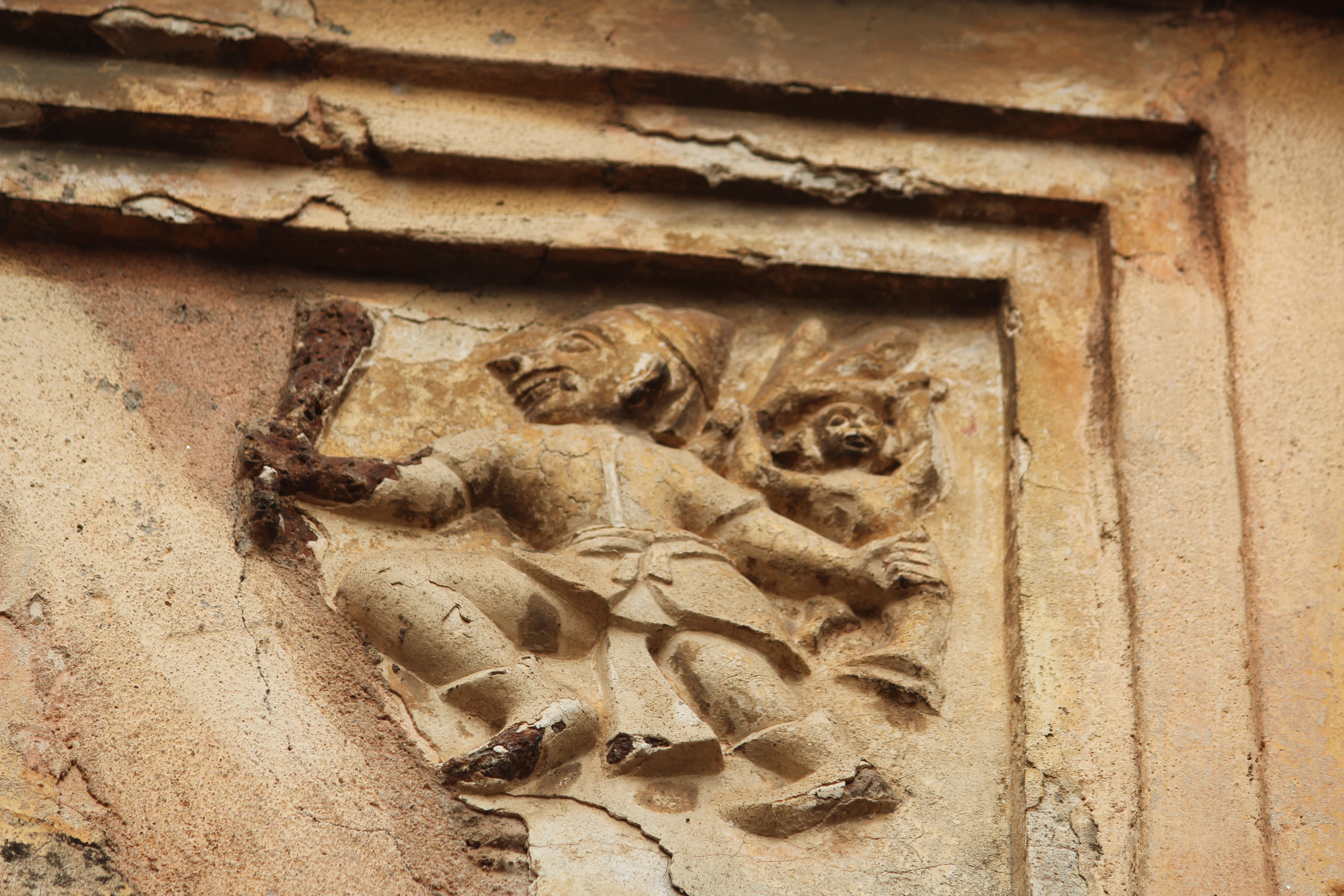

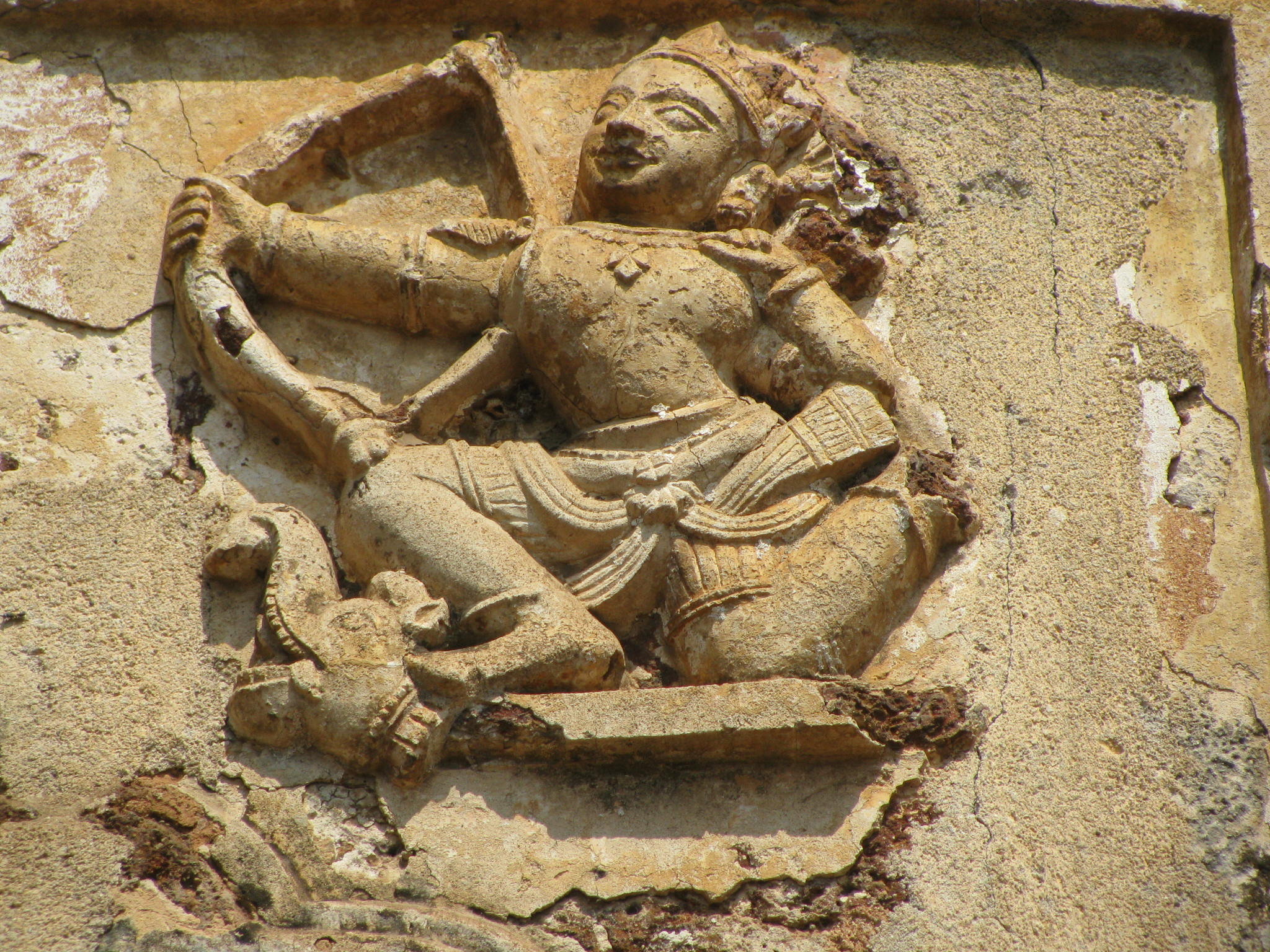

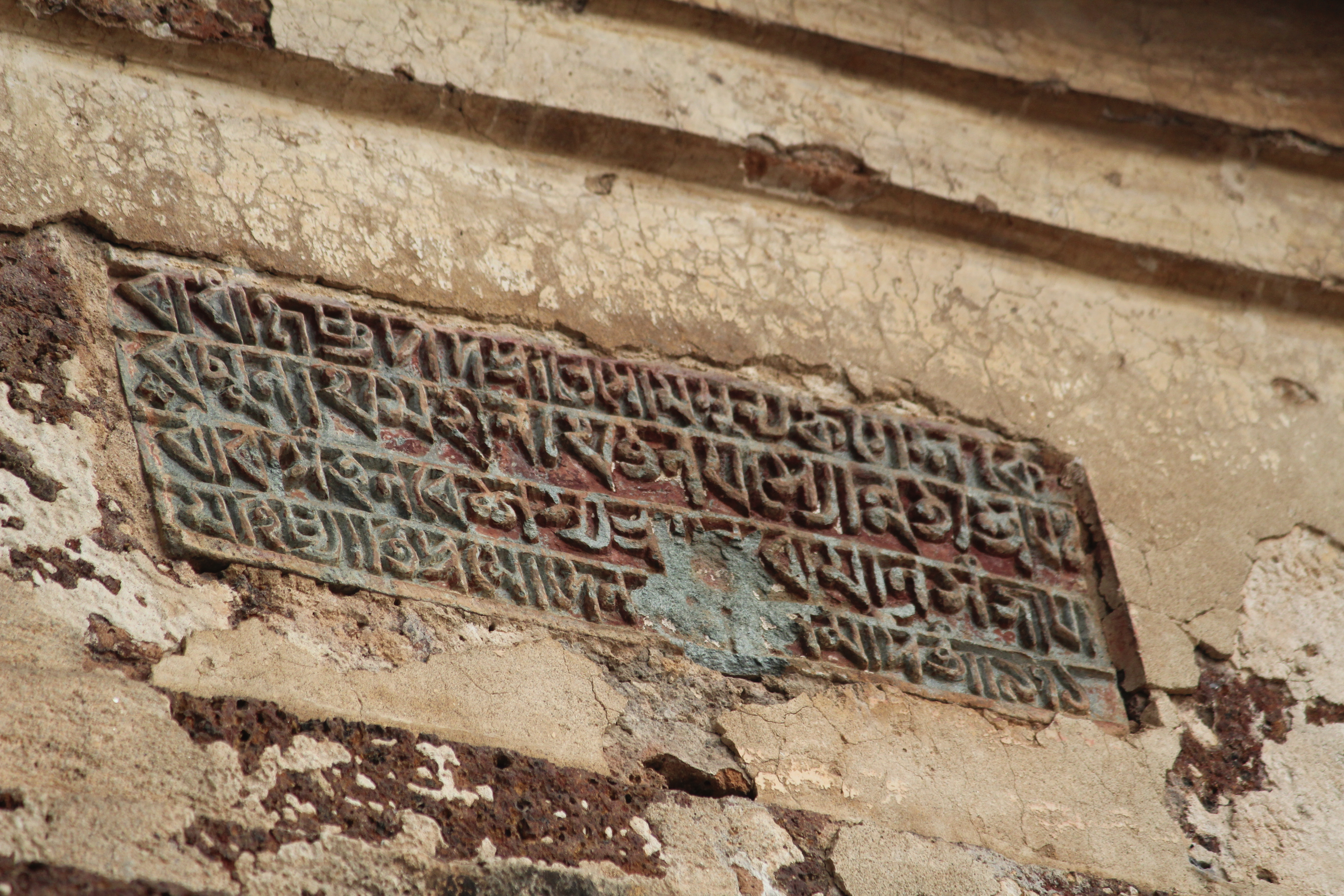

== Sources ==
- Biswas, S. S. (1992). Bishnupur (University of Illinois at Urbana-Champaign ed.). Director General, Archaeological Survey of India.
