= Beth El Synagogue (Kolkata) =

Coordinates: 22.5757°N 88.3523°E

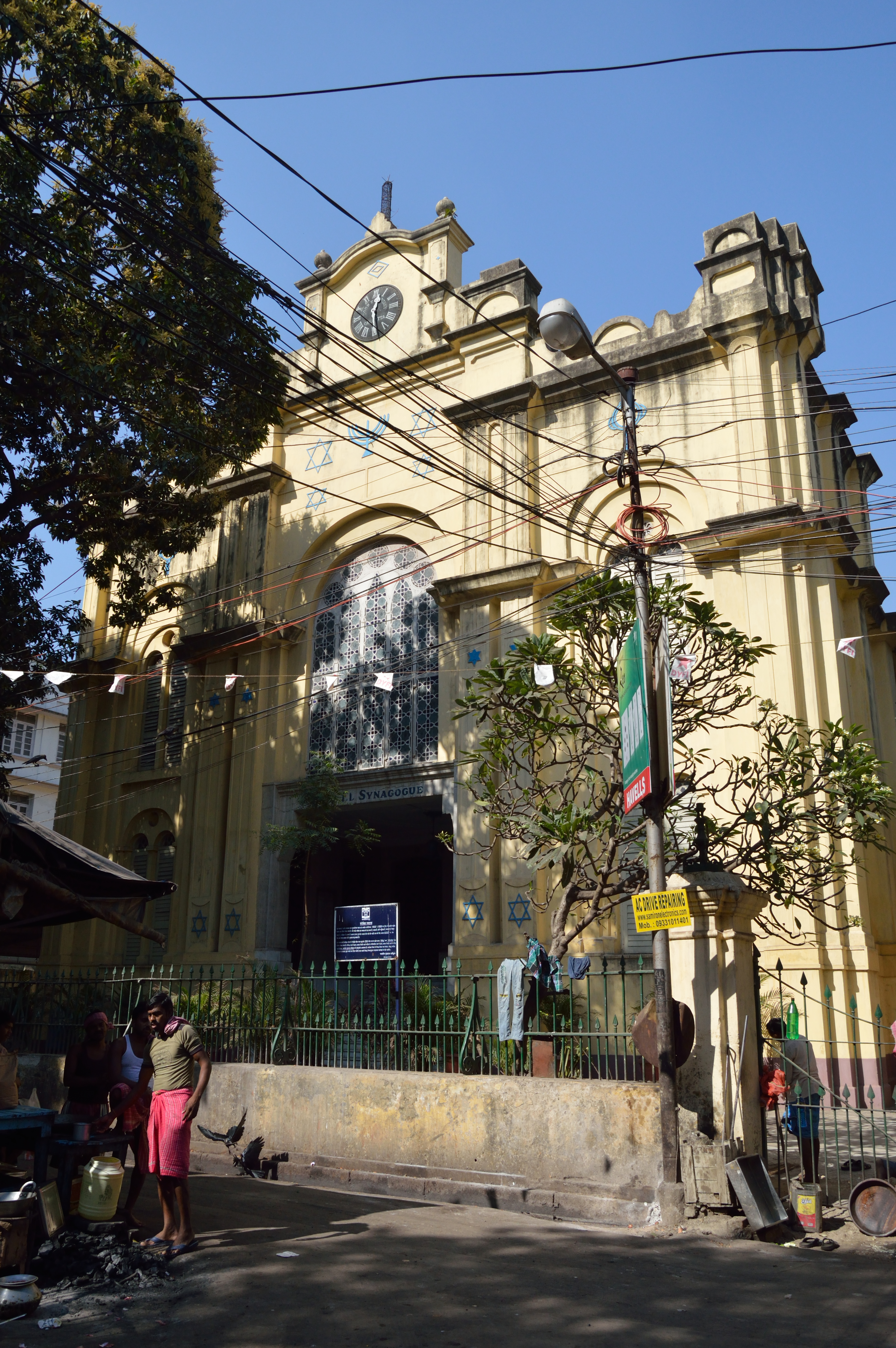

Religion
- Affiliation: Judaism

Beth El Synagogue is a synagogue located in Kolkata, in the Indian state of West Bengal. It is a monument of national importance.

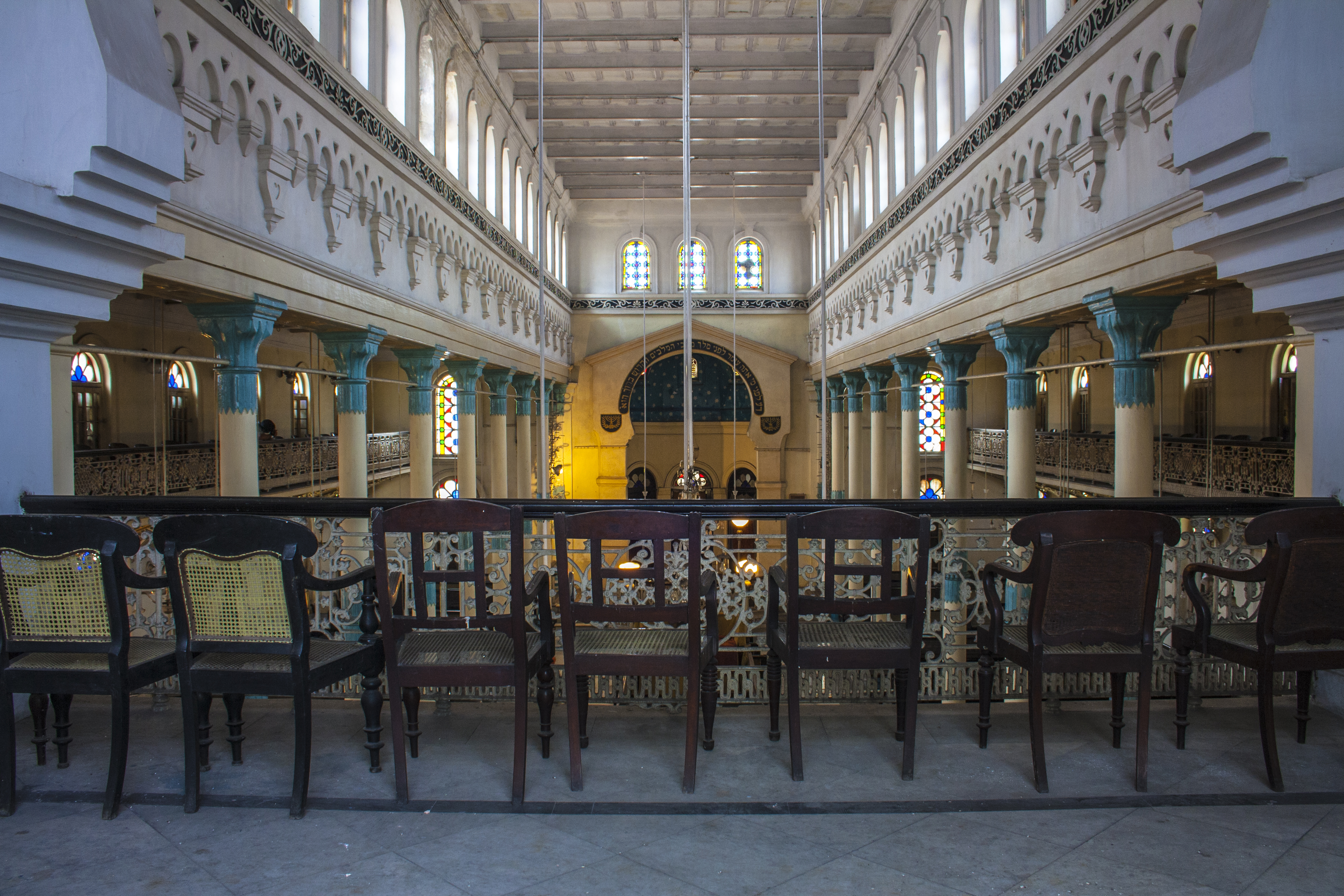
Interior

== History ==
It was built in 1856.

== Architecture ==
Above the entrance is a pediment, depicting four Stars of David and a menorah, with a Cooke and Kelvey clock above.

== See also ==
- History of the Jews in India
- List of synagogues in India
