= Radha Gobind Temple =

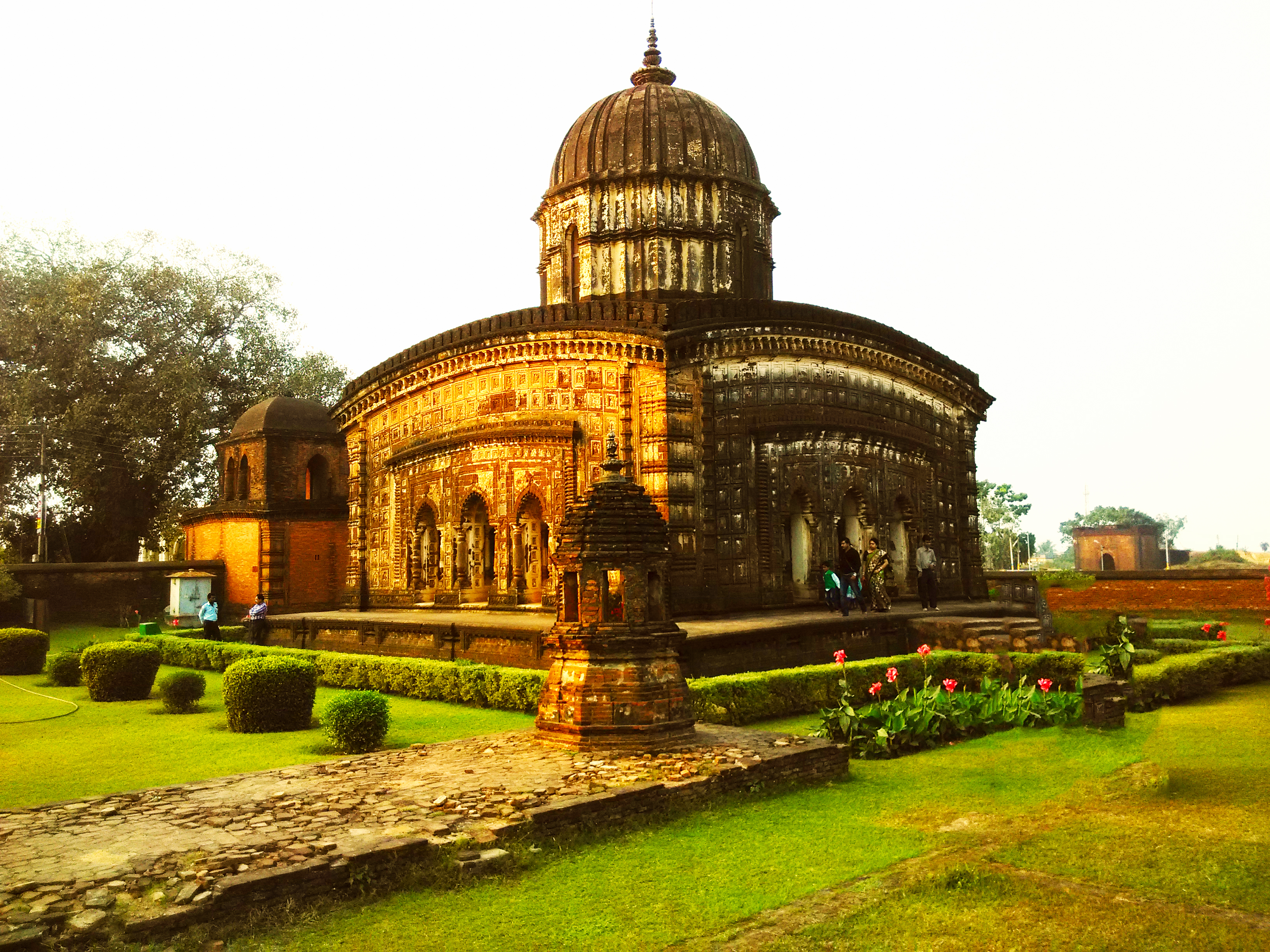

Religion
- Affiliation: Hinduism
- District: Bankura

Location
- Location: Bishnupur
- State: West Bengal
- Country: India
- Geographic coordinates: 23°3′36.18″N 87°19′23.45″E

Architecture
- Type: Bengal temple architecture
- Style: ek-ratna style
- Founder: Krishna Singha Dev son of Gopal Singha Dev
- Date established: 1729; 296 years ago

Specifications
- Length: 12.4 m (41 ft)
- Width: 12.4 m (41 ft)
- Height (max): 10.7 m (35 ft)
- Monument of National Importance
- Official name: Radha Govind Temple
- Type: Cultural
- Reference no.: IN-WB-21

Radha Gobind Temple (also known as Radha Govind Temple), is a Krishna temple located in Bishnupur in Indian state of West Bengal.

== History and architecture ==
According to the inscriptional plaque found in the temple, the temple was founded in 1729 by Krishna Singha Dev son of Gopal Singha Dev King of Mallabhum. The Temple is built in the Ek-ratna style temple architecture.

The Radha-Govinda temple is located near the Lal-bandh. It has a square layout, with each side measuring 12.4 meters, and a curved roof topped with a tower. The temple stands at a height of 10.7 meters. In front of the sanctum, there is a porch featuring three arched openings on its sides. The front wall and the area beneath the cornice are adorned with bas-relief carvings, crafted from individual blocks.

Currently, it is preserved as one of the archaeological monuments by the Archaeological Survey of India.

== Gallery ==
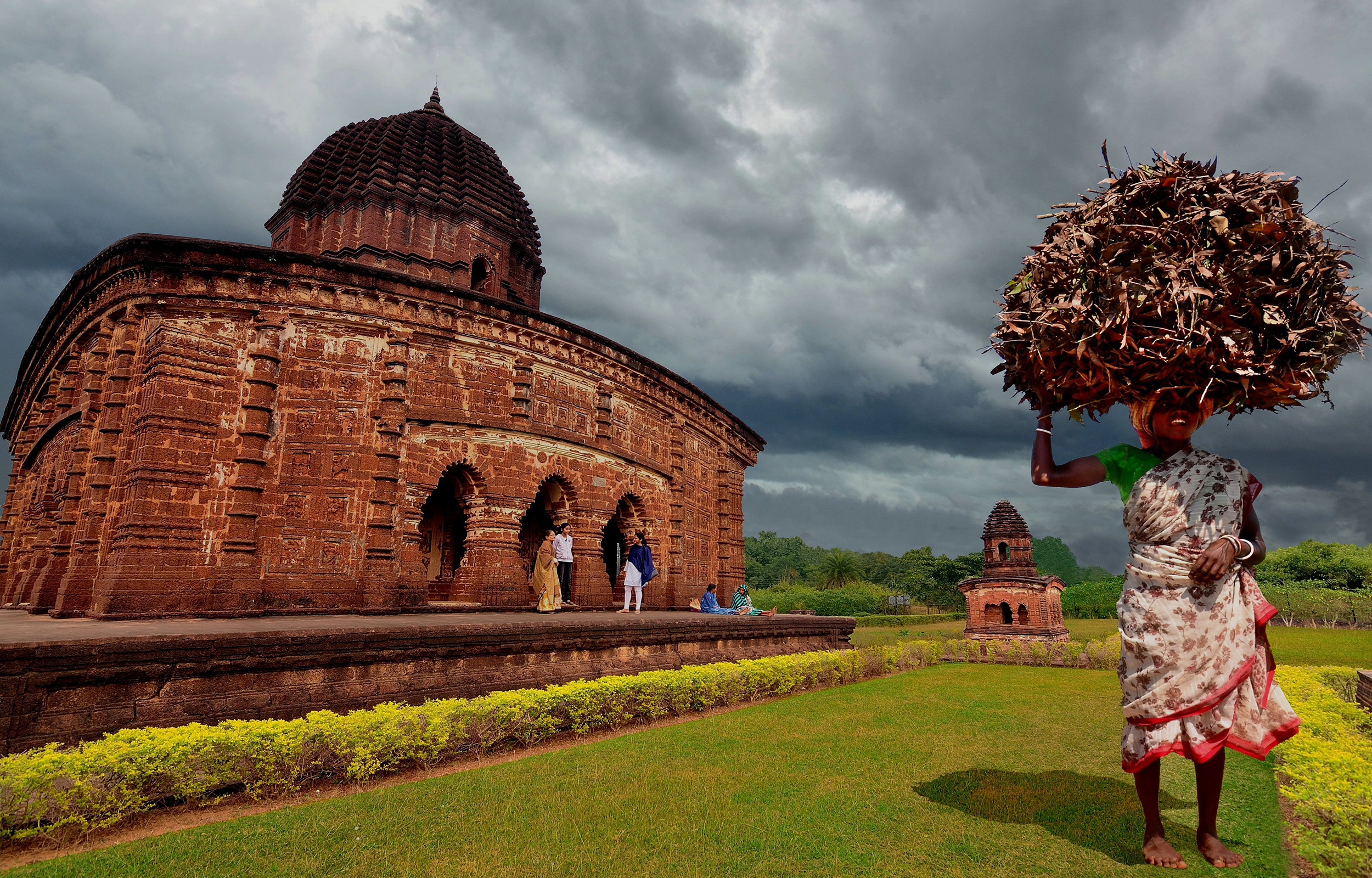

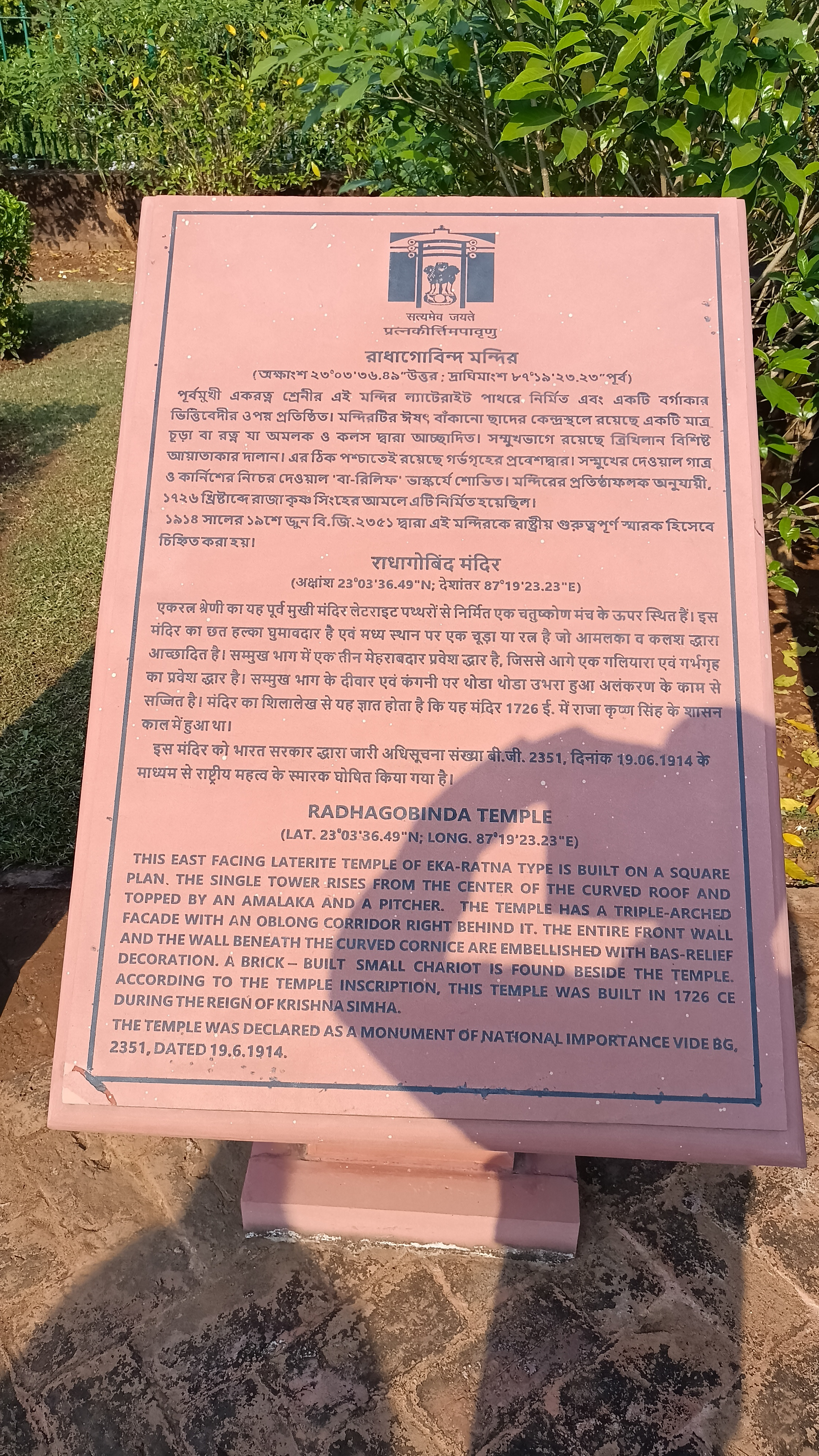

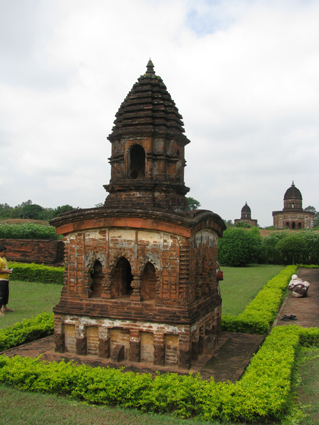

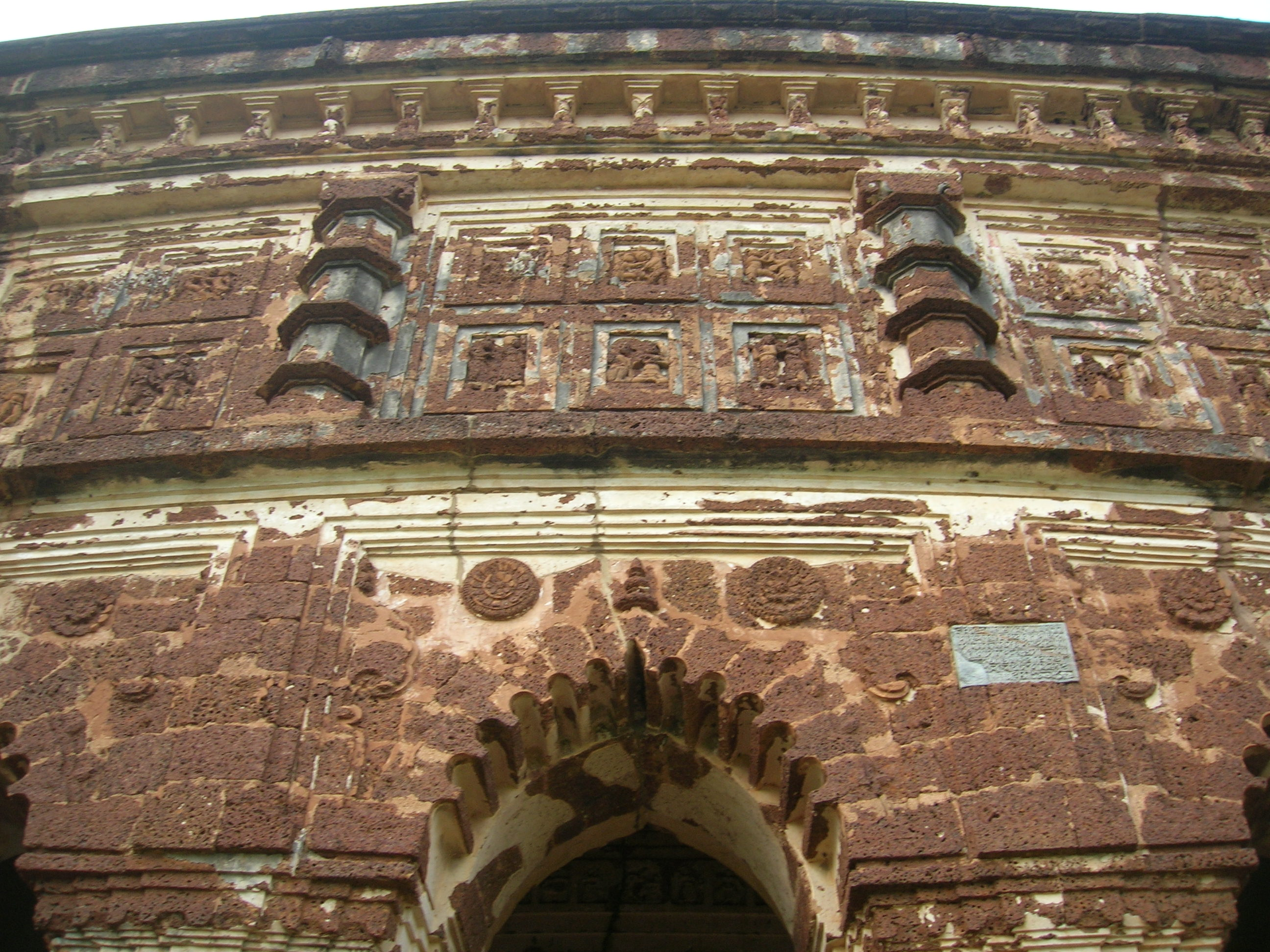

== Sources ==
- Biswas, S. S. (1992). Bishnupur (University of Illinois at Urbana-Champaign ed.). Director General, Archaeological Survey of India.
