= Dargah of Shah Ata =

Sufi mausoleum in West Bengal, India

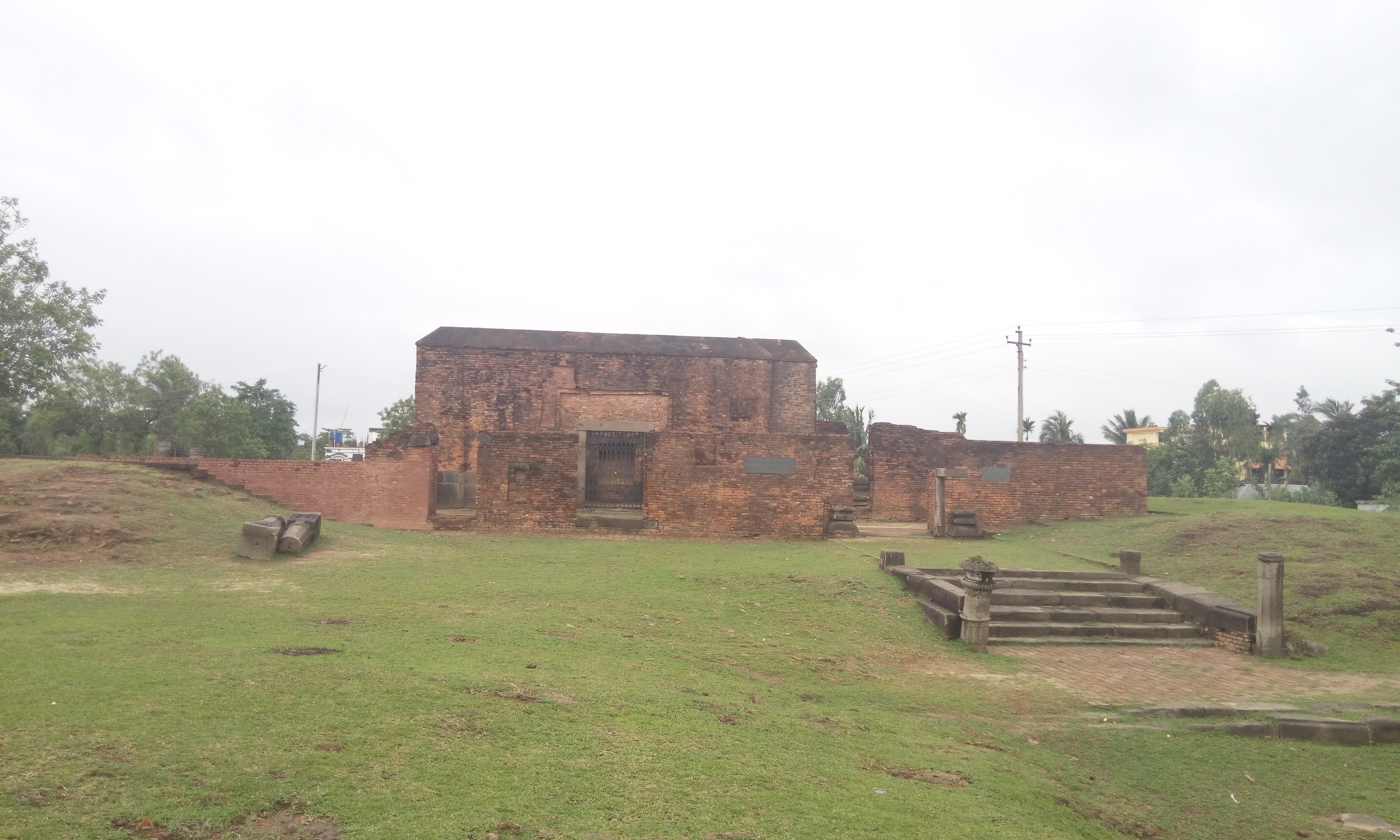
- The mausoleum in 2017

- Location of the dargah in West Bengal

Religion
- Affiliation: Sunni Islam
- Sect: Sufism
- Ecclesiastical or organizational status: Dargah
- Status: Active
- Dedication: Mollah Atar-Uddin (also known as Shah Ata)

Location
- Location: Dhaldighi North, Gangarampur, West Bengal
- Country: India
- Interactive map of Dargah of Shah Ata
- Coordinates: 25°24′04″N 88°31′52″E

Architecture
- Completed: 14th century
- Materials: Brick and stone

The Dargah of Shah Ata is a dargah complex, located in Bangarh, Gangarampur, in the state of West Bengal, India; sited adjacent to Dhaldighi Lake. The brick-built structure, likely constructed in the 14th century AD, is a square, roofless mausoleum enclosing the grave of Mollah Atar-Uddin, also known as Shah Ata. Its lower portion is made of stone. Originally identified as a Dargah, it is actually a mosque featuring niches. Four Arabic inscriptions adorn its walls. Remnants suggest a pre-existing Pala-period (c. 750–1161) temple at the site.
