= List of gates in India =

This is a list of gates in India, including the entrance gateways of forts, palaces, tombs, and mosques, organized by state.

== West Bengal ==
- Kotwali Gate
- Dakhil Darwaza
- Lukochuri Darwaza
- Gumti Darwaza

== Assam ==
- Northbrook Gate

== Bihar ==
- Sabhyata Dwar

== Delhi ==
- Ajmeri Gate
- Alai Darwaza
- Bahadur Shahi Gate
- Delhi Gate
- Delhi Gate (Red Fort)
- Entrance to Humayun's Tomb
- Entrance to Jama Masjid
- Entrance of the Mausoleum of Ghiyath al-Din Tughluq at Tughlaqabad Fort
- Gateway into Arab Sarai, near Humayun's Tomb Complex
- India Gate
- Jamali Kamali Entrance, Mehrauli
- Kabuli Gate
- Kashmiri Gate
- Khooni Darwaza
- Lahori Gate (Red Fort)
- Lal Darwaza
- Main Gate to Tomb of Safdarjung
- Nigambodh Gate
- Tripolia Gates
- Turkman Gate
- Water Gate of Red Fort
- Zafar Gate of Zafar Mahal, Mehrauli

== Goa ==
- Gate of Rachol Fortress
- Gate of Saint Paul's College

== Gujarat ==
- Akshardwar, Shri Swaminarayan Mandir, Bhavnagar
- Gates of Ahmedabad
- Sayajirao Palace Gate, Vadodara
- Vadodari Gate, Dabhoi
- Tan Darvajaa (Three Gates), Dhoraji
- Teen Darwaza, Bhadra Fort, Ahmedabad
- Ray Gate, Junagadh
- Majhevdi Gate, Junagadh.

== Karnataka ==
- Bidar Fort Gate, Bidar
- Daria Daulat Bagh Gate, Srirangapatna
- Vittala Temple Gate, Hampi

== Madhya Pradesh ==
- Sanchi Gateways (Toranas), Sanchi
- Bhopal Gate, Bhopal
- Jumerati Gate, Bhopal
- Sadar Darwaza, Bhopal
- Bagh Farhat Afza Gate, Bhopal
- Bab-E-Sikandari, Bhopal
- Bab-E-Ali Gate, Bhopal
- Shaukat Mahal Gate, Bhopal
- Teen Mohere Gate, Bhopal
- Dakhil Darwaza, Bhopal
- Kala Darwaza, Bhopal
- Lal Darwaza, Bhopal
- Sultania Infantry Gate, Bhopal
- Imami Gate, Bhopal
- Taj-ul-Masjid Gate, Bhopal
- Moti Masjid Gateway, Bhopal
- Moti Mahal Darwaza 1 and 2, Bhopal
- Jam Gate, Maheshwar
- Sitamau Fort Gate, Sitamau
- Delhi Darwaza (the main entrance), Mandavgad
- Alamgir Darwaza, Mandu
- Gadi Darwaza, Mandu
- Bhangi Darwaza, Mandu
- Ram Pol Darwaza, Mandu
- Bhagwania Gate, Bhagwanpur, Mandu
- Tarapur Gate, Mandu
- Kamani / Kabaani Darwaza, Mandu
- Tripoltya Darwaza, Mandu
- Tarapur Darwaza, Mandu
- Jahangirpur Darwaza, Mandu
- Lohani Darwaza, Mandu
- Hathi Pol (or Hathiya Paur, main entrance), Gwalior Fort
- Badalgarh Gate, Gwalior Fort
- Gate of Teli Mandir, Gwalior
- Urvahi Gate, Gwalior Fort
- Jahangir Mahal Gate, Orchha
- Pravin Rai Mahal Gate, Orchha
- Orchha Fort Gate, Orchha
- Ratlami Gate, Jaora
- Khooni Darwaza, Chanderi fort

== Maharashtra ==
- Bhadkal Gate, Aurangabad
- Delhi Gate, Aurangabad
- Entrance to Bibi Ka Maqbara, Aurangabad
- Gateway of aurangabad, aurangabad
- Kaala Gate, Aurangabad
- Mahmood Gate, Aurangabad
- Makai Gate, Aurangabad
- Mecca Gate, Aurangabad
- Paithan Gate, Aurangabad
- Rangeen Gate, Aurangabad
- Roshan Gate, Aurangabad
- Katkat Gate, Aurangabad
- Barapulla Gate, Aurangabad
- Naubat Gate, Aurangabad
- Khaas Gate, Aurangabad
- Jaffar Gate, Aurangabad
- Begum Gate, Aurangabad
- Chota Bhadkal Gate, Aurangabad
- Hathi Gate, Aurangabad
- Khooni Gate, Aurangabad
- Mir Adil Gate, Aurangabad
- Buland Gate, Aurangabad

== Punjab ==
- Nurmahal Sarai Mughal Gateway

== Rajasthan ==
- Chandpole, Chanpori Gate, Surajpole, Ajmeri gate, New gate, Sanganeri gate, Ghat gate, Samrat gate, Zorawar Singh Gate at Jaipur
- Ganesh Pol, Suraj Pol, Tripolia gate, Lion gate at Amer Fort, Jaipur
- Hanuman Pol at Kumbhalgarh, Rajsamand District
- Jayapol, Fattehpol, Dedh Kamgra Pol and Loha Pol at Mehrangarh Fort in Jodhpur
- Karan Pol, Suraj Pol, Daulat Pol, Chand Pol and Fateh Pol at Junagarh Fort, Bikaner
- Ram Pol, Padan Pol, Bhairon Pol, Hanuman Pol, Ganesh Pol, Jodla Pol, Laxman Pol at Chittor Fort

== Telangana ==
- Chowmahalla Palace gate tower, Hyderabad
- Kakatiya Kala Thoranam or Warangal Gate

== Uttar Pradesh ==
- Babe Syed Gate, Aligarh Muslim University, Aligarh
- Amar Singh Gate, Agra
- Buland Darwaza, Fatehpur Sikri
- Entrance Gate to Jama Masjid, Agra
- Entrance Gate to Tomb of Akbar the Great, Agra
- Entrance Gate to Tomb of I'timād-ud-Daulah, Agra
- Entrance to Bahu Begum ka Maqbara, Faizabad
- Gateway to Bara Imambara, Lucknow
- Gateway to Gulab Bari, Faizabad
- Great gate (Darwaza-i rauza) Taj Mahal, Agra
- Laal Darwaza, Ramnagar Fort, Varanasi
- Rumi Darwaza, Lucknow
- Shahji Temple Gate, Vrindavan
- Ekdara, Faizabad

== Gallery ==
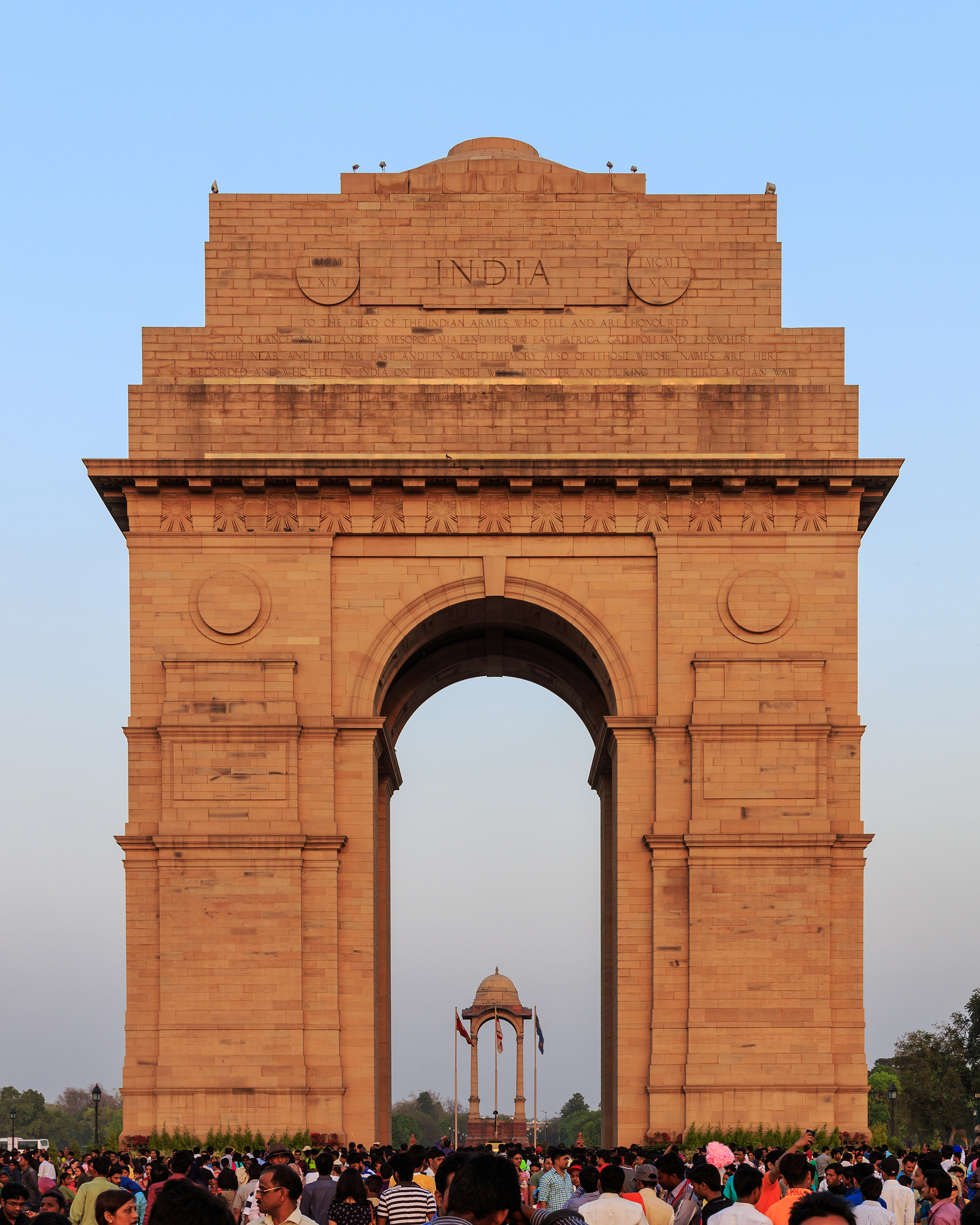
India Gate, Delhi

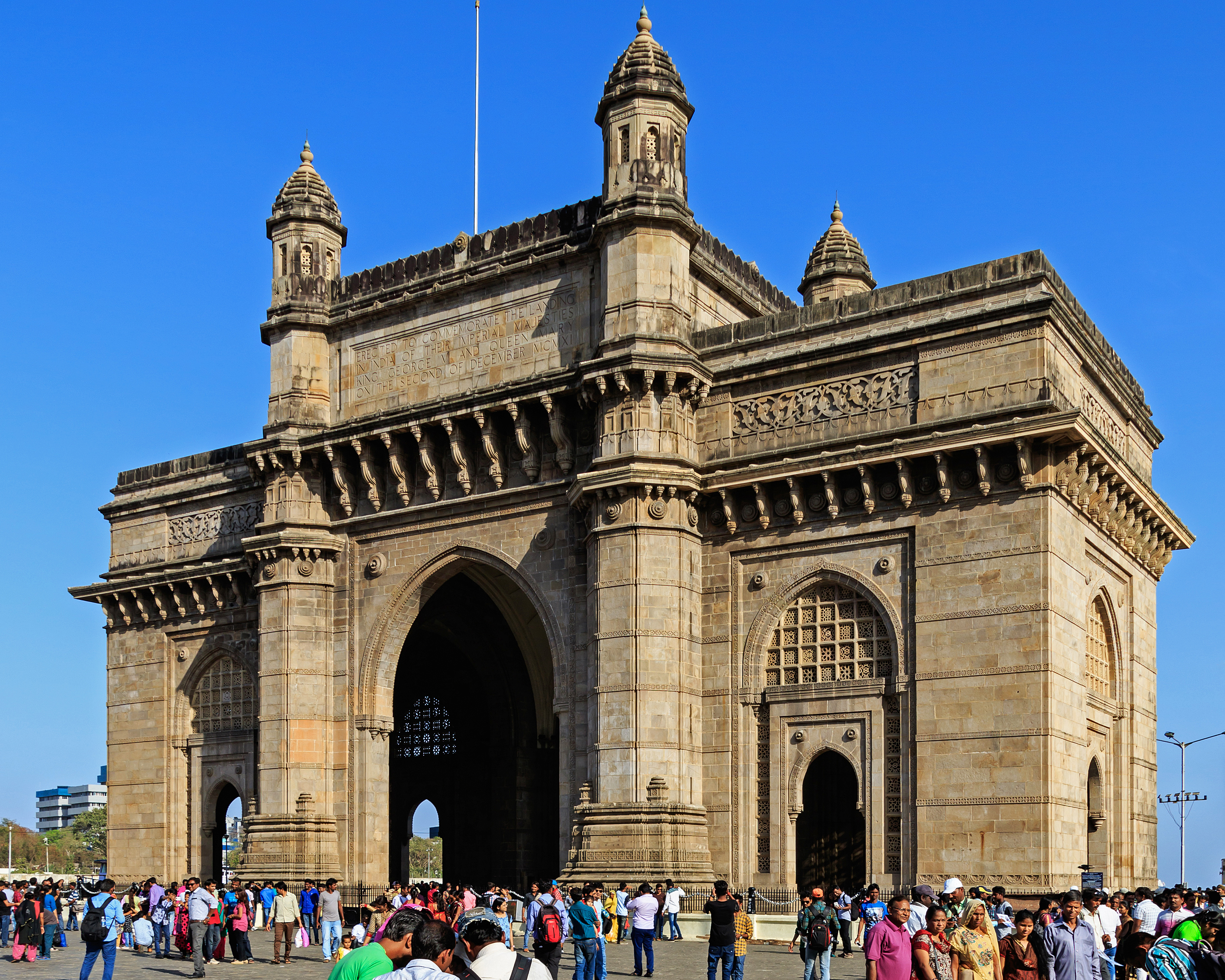
Gateway of India, Mumbai

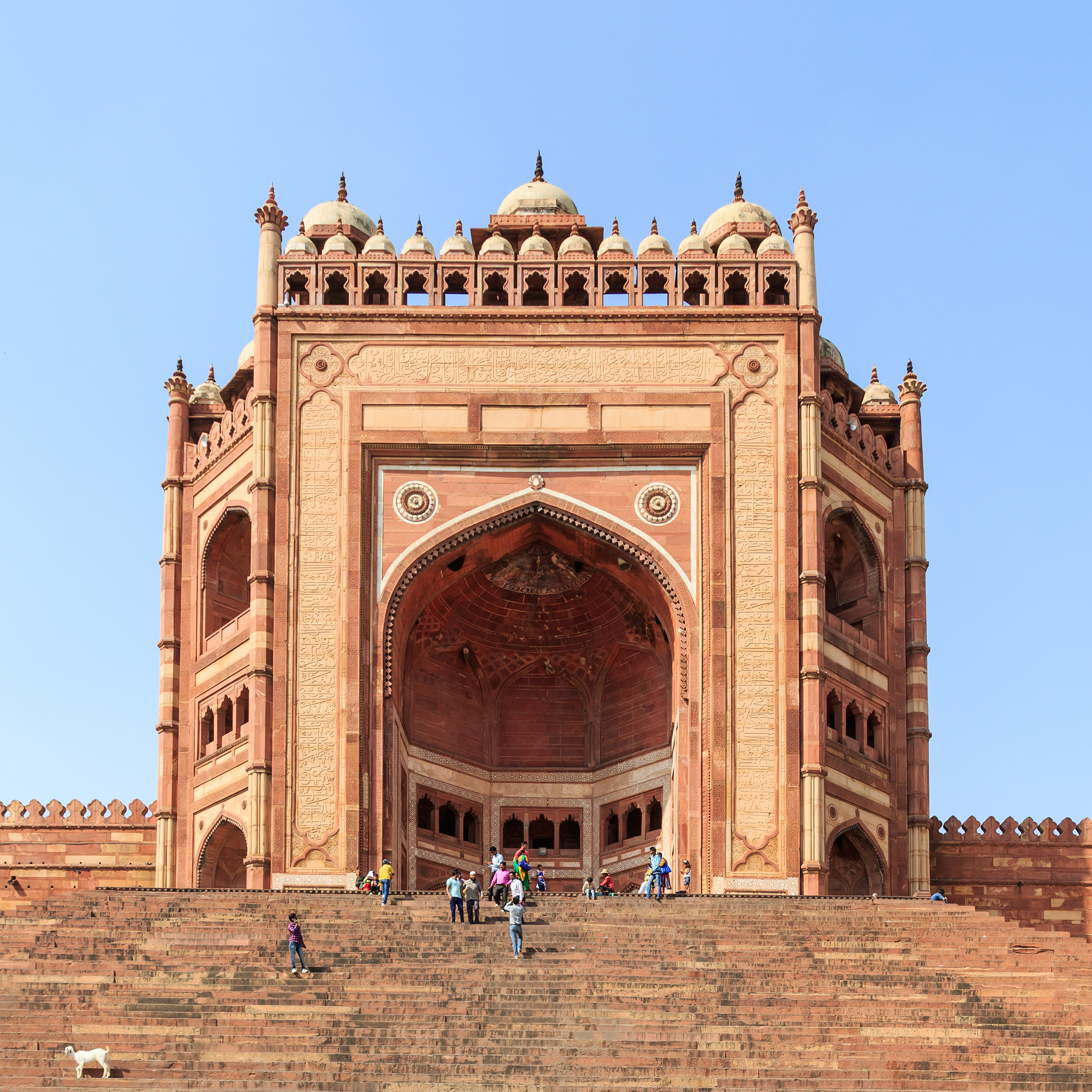
Buland Darwaza, Fatehpur Sikri

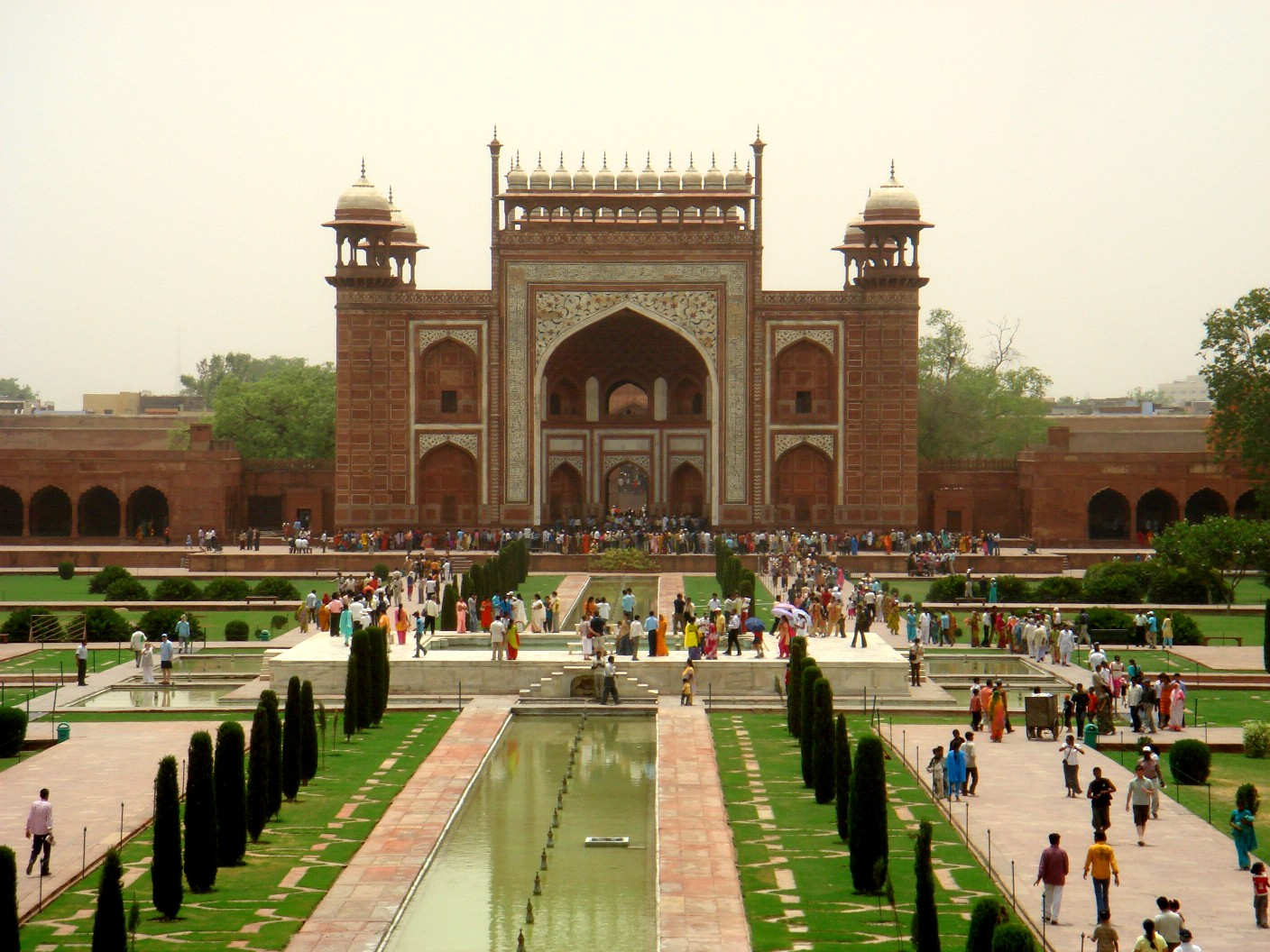
Great gate (Darwaza-i Rauza), the main entrance to Taj Mahal, Agra

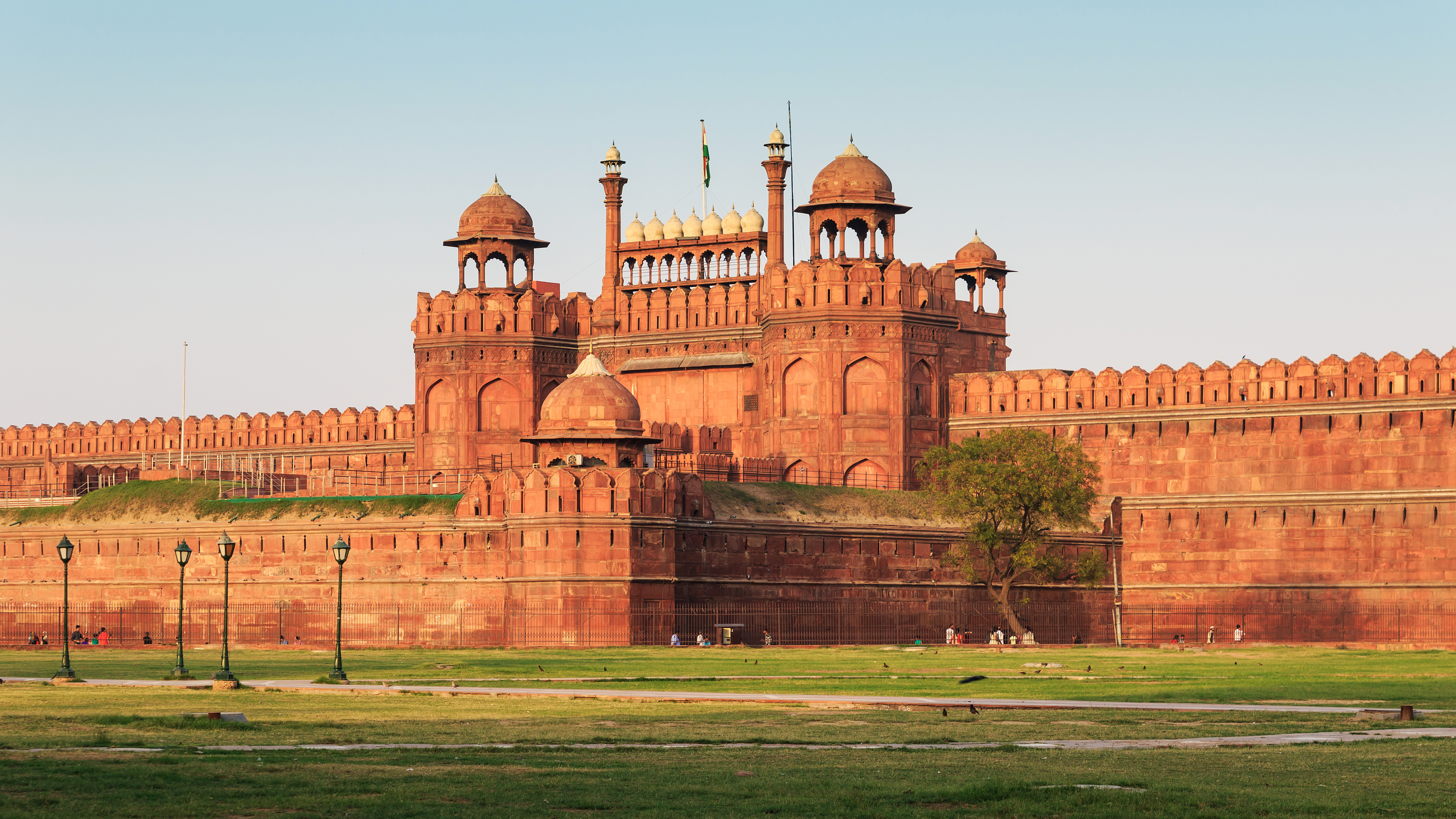
Red Fort Entry Gate, Delhi

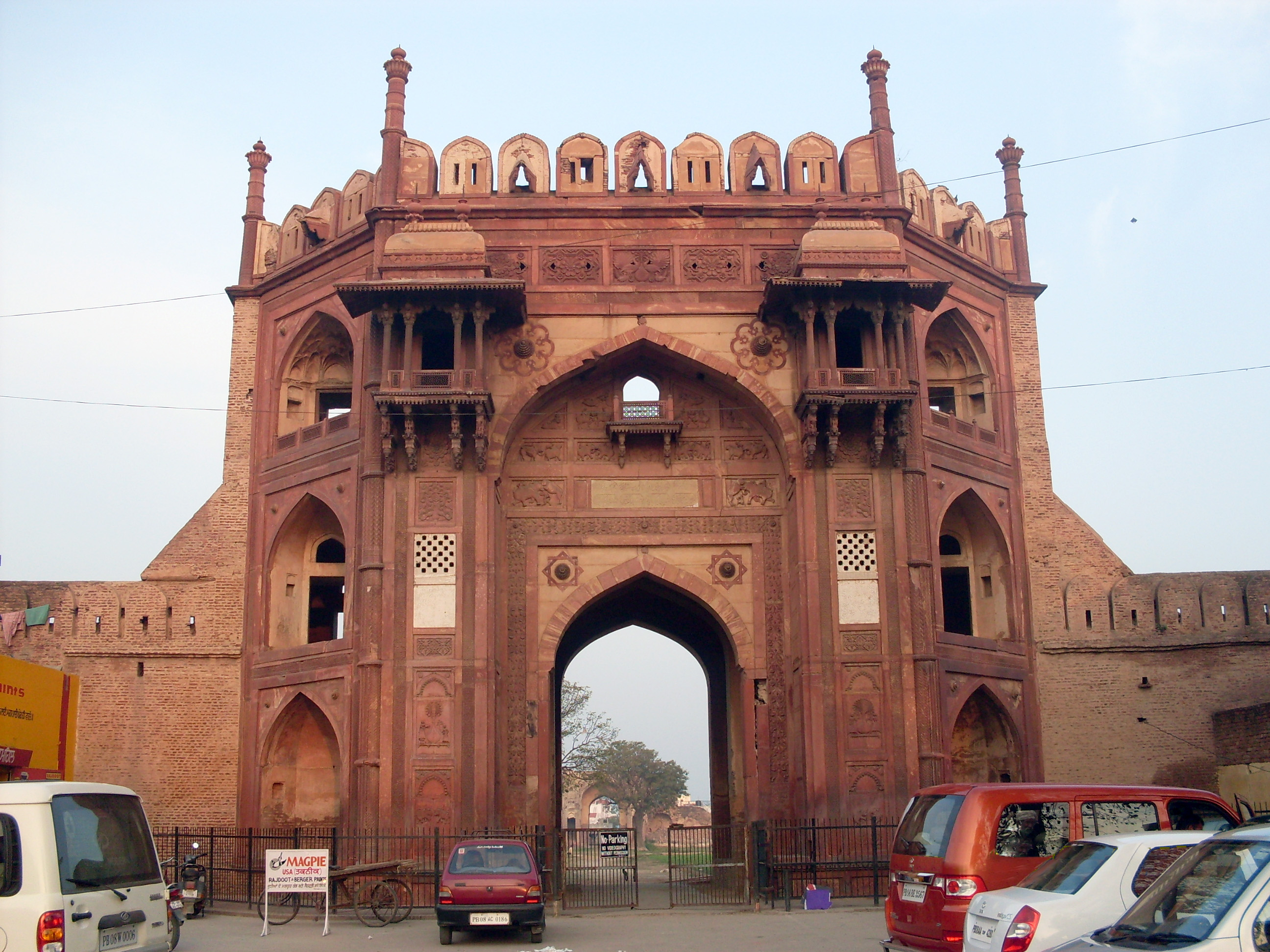
Nurmahal Sarai Gateway, Punjab

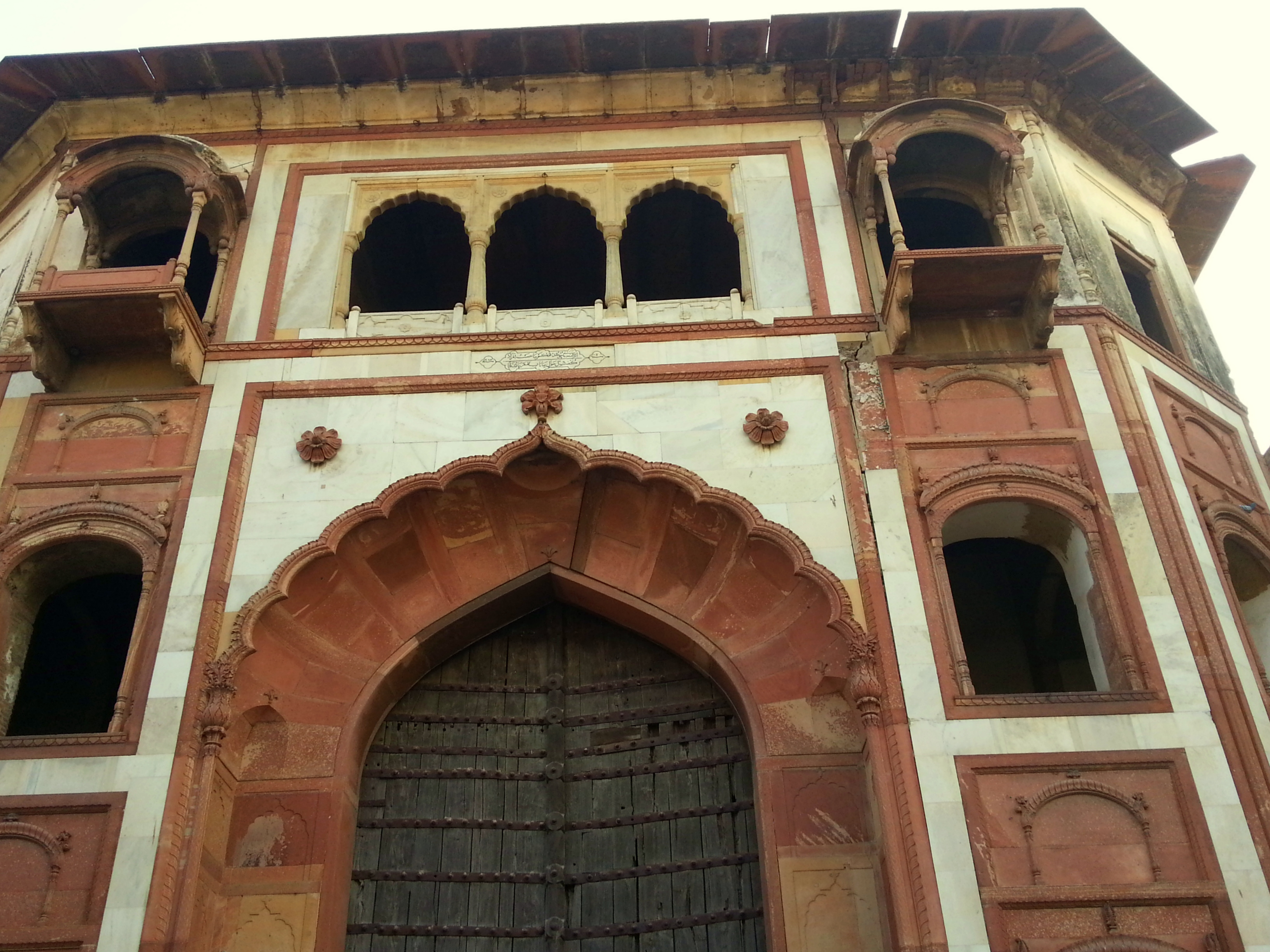
Zafar Gate, Mehrauli, Delhi

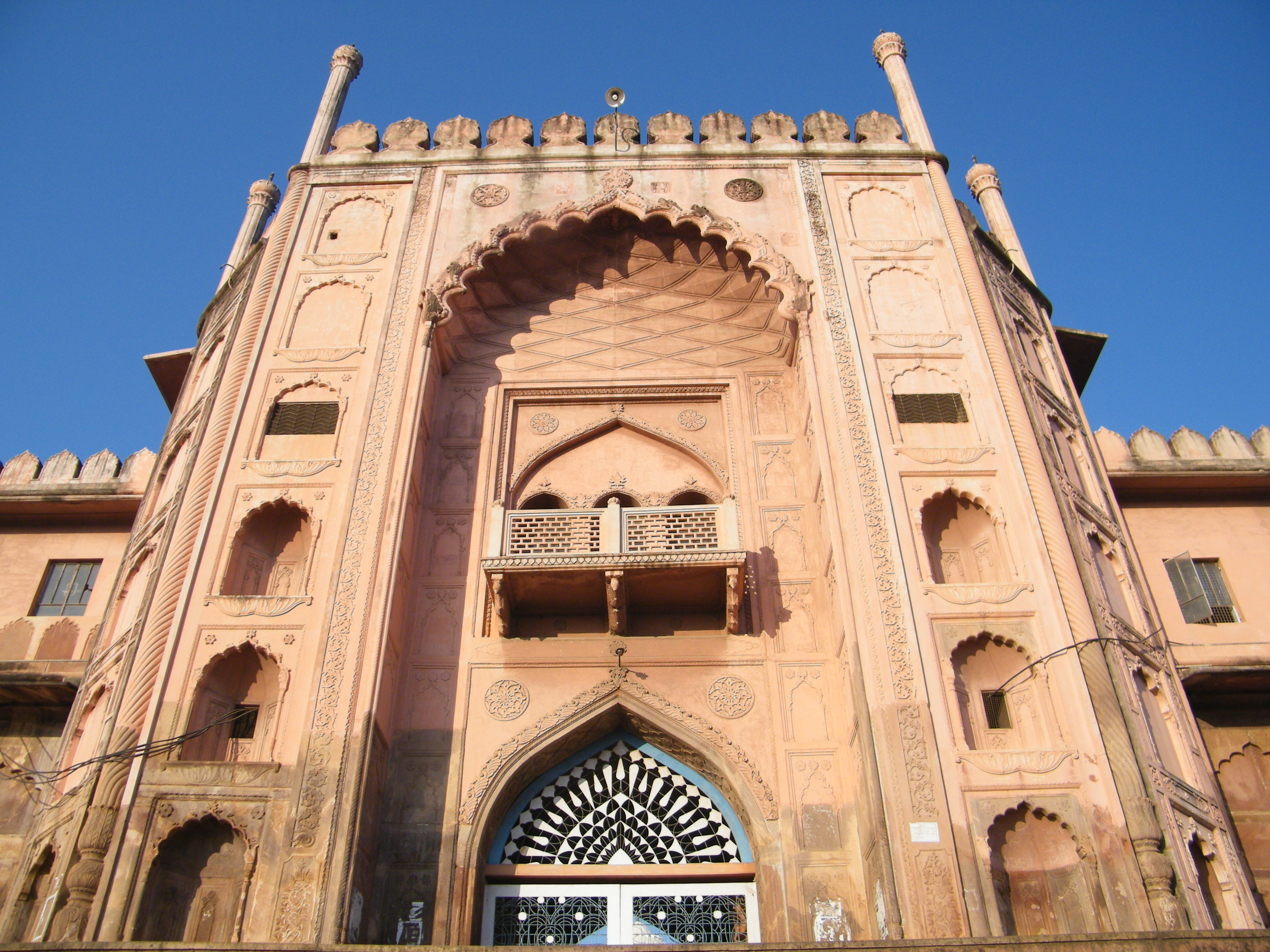
Entrance Gate of Taj-ul-Masajid, Bhopal

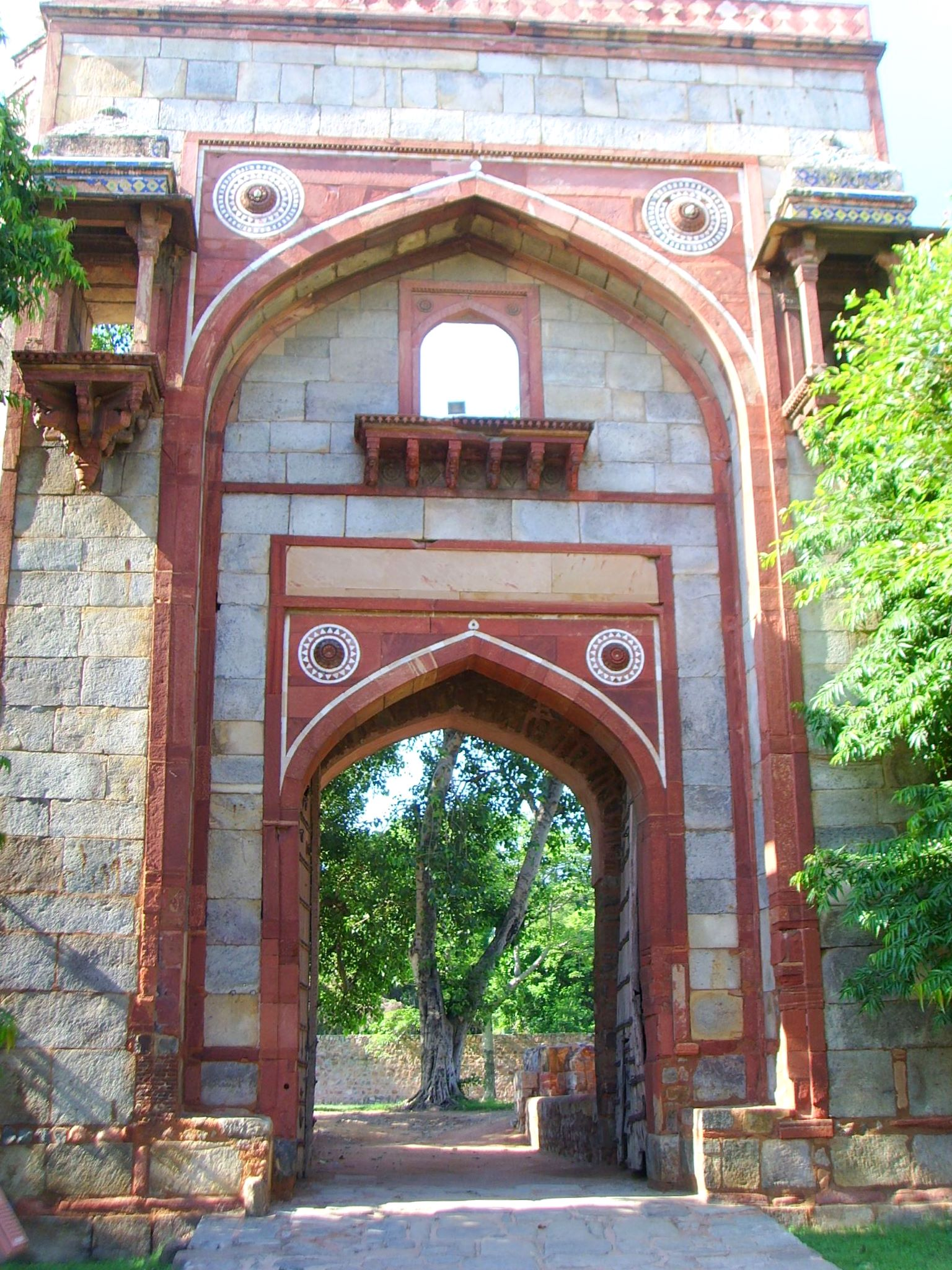
Gateway into Arab Sarai, near Humayun's tomb complex, Delhi

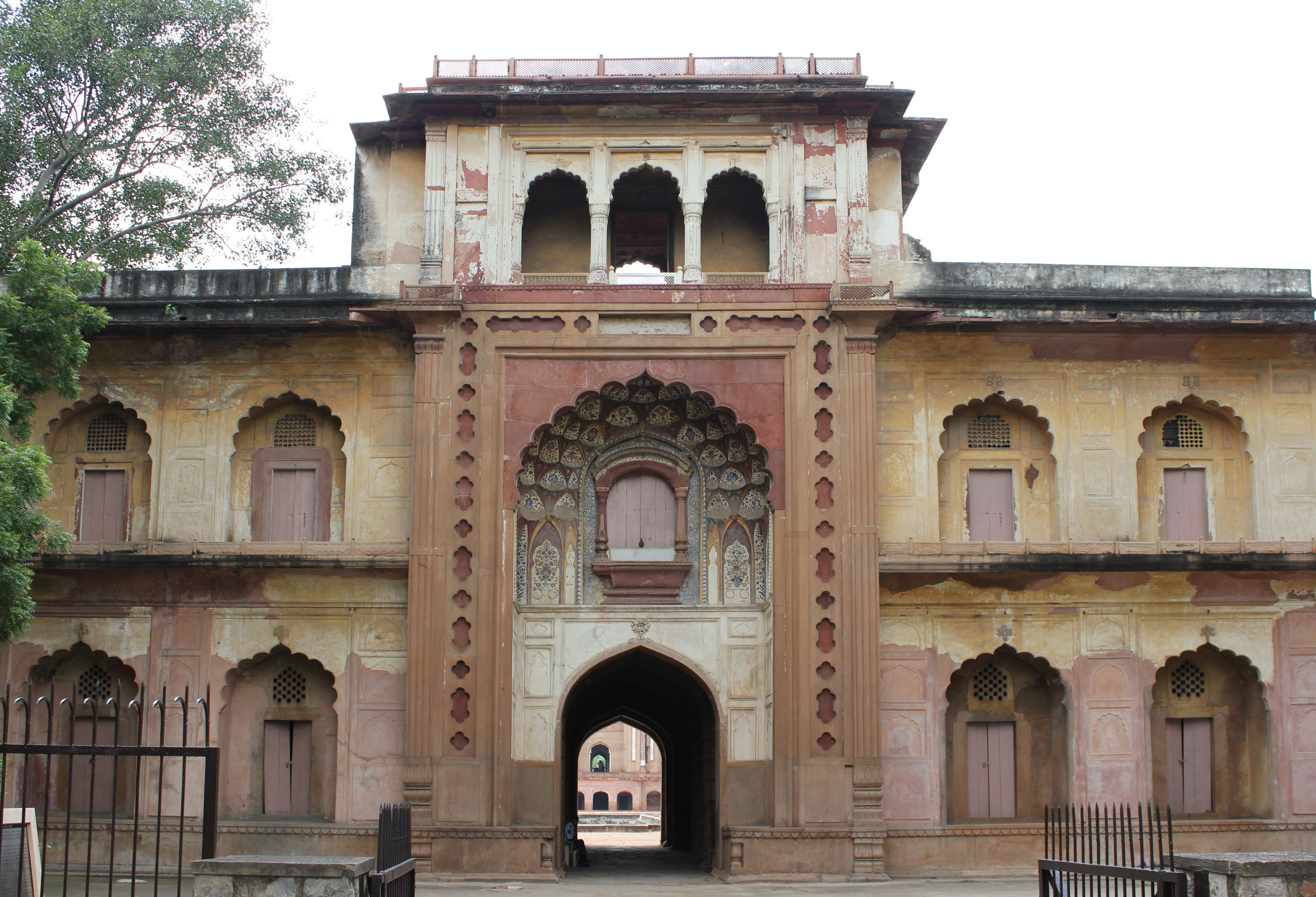
Main Gateway to Safdurjang Tomb, Delhi

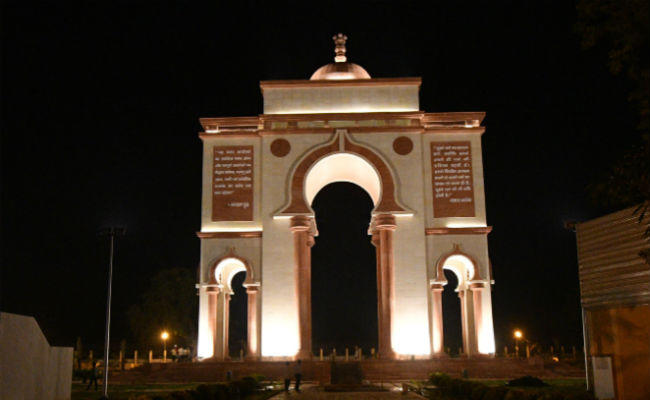
Sabhyata Gate, Patna

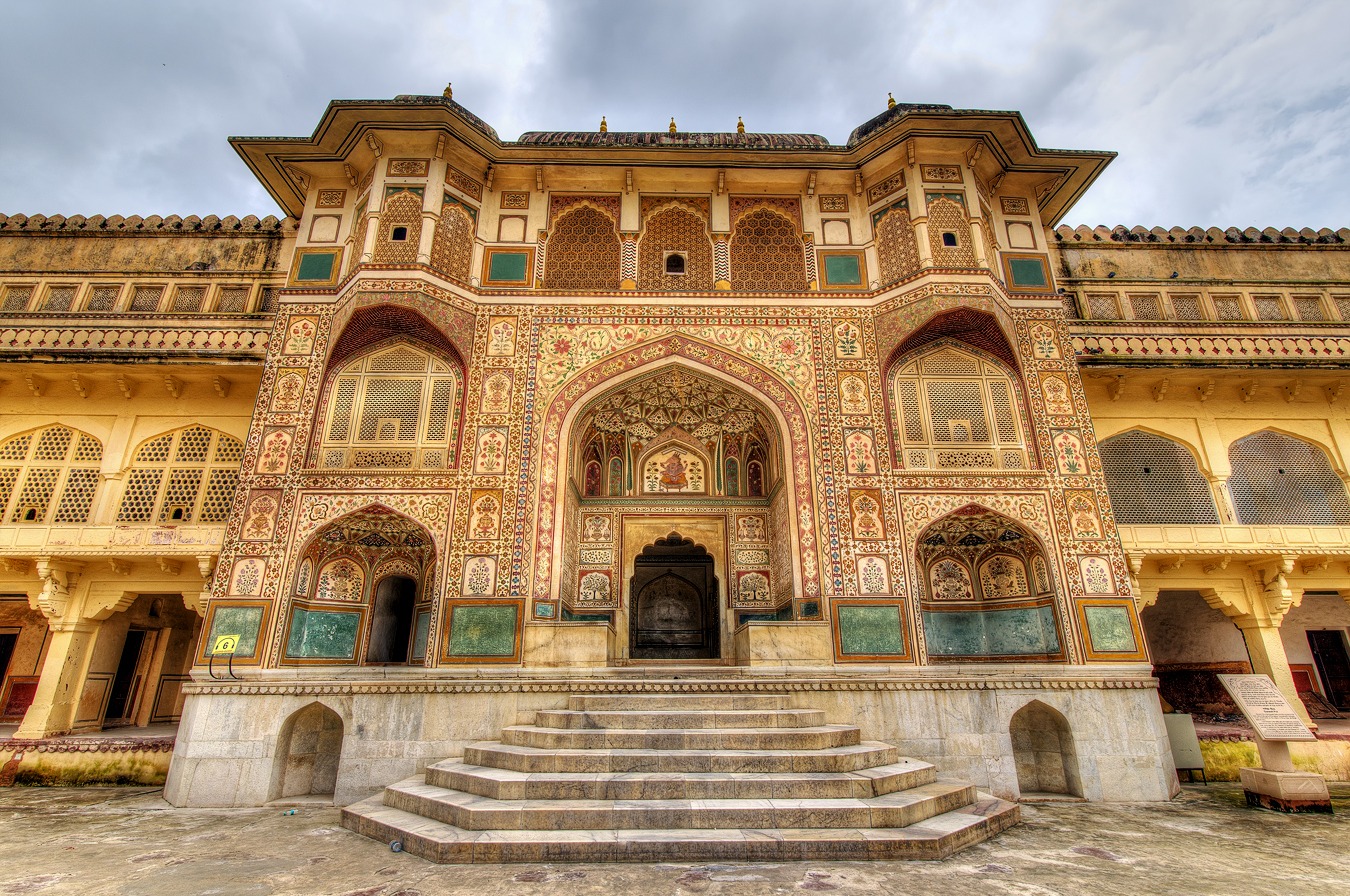
Ganesh Pol Entrance, Amer Fort, Jaipur

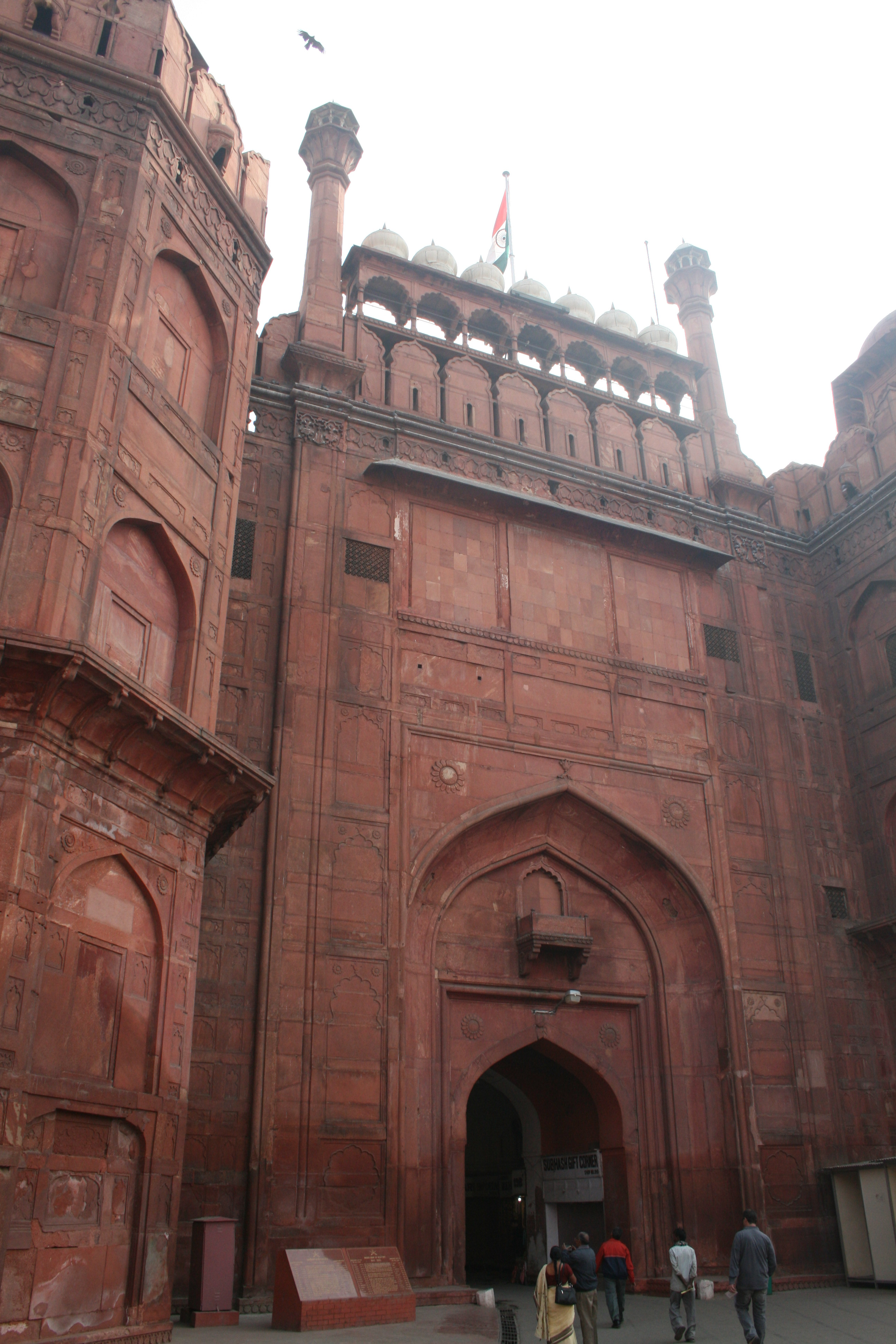
Lahori Gate, the main entrance to the Red Fort, Delhi

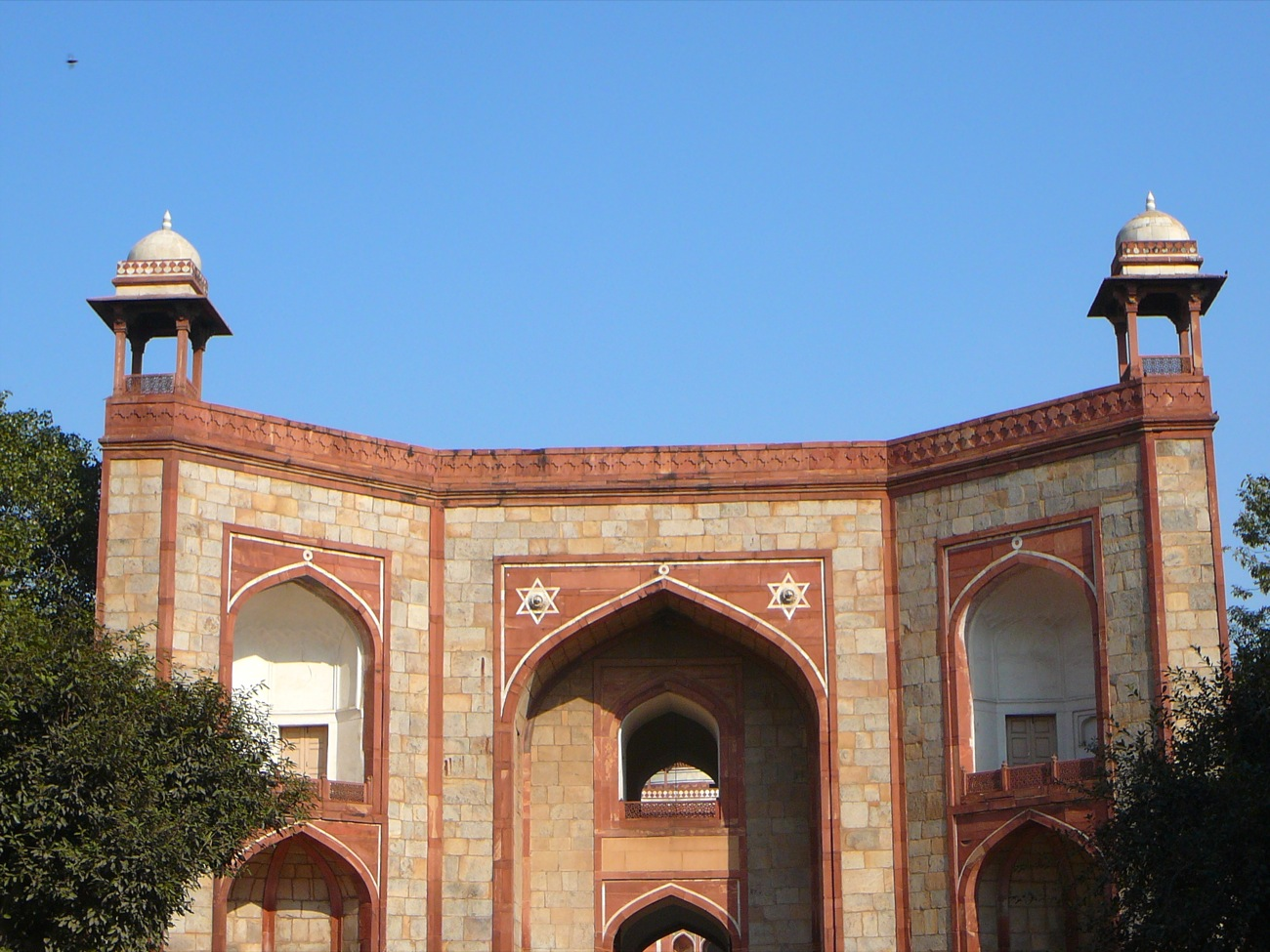
Entrance to Humayuns Tomb, Delhi

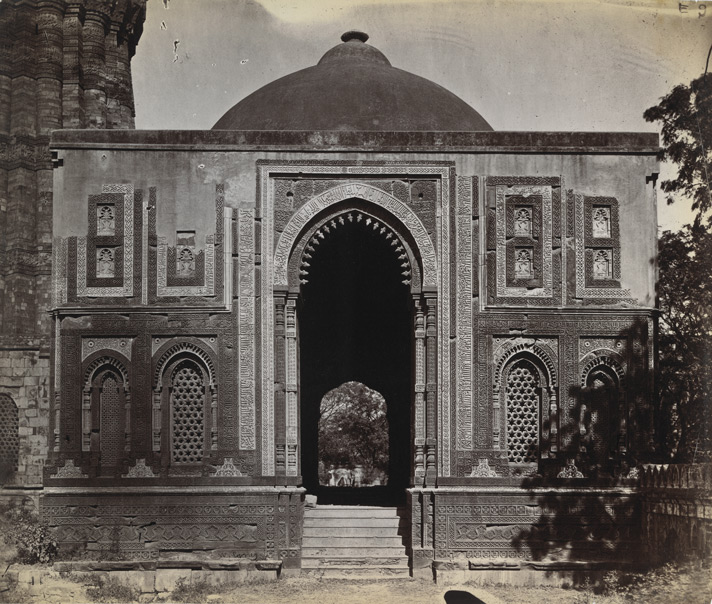
Alai Darwaza, Delhi

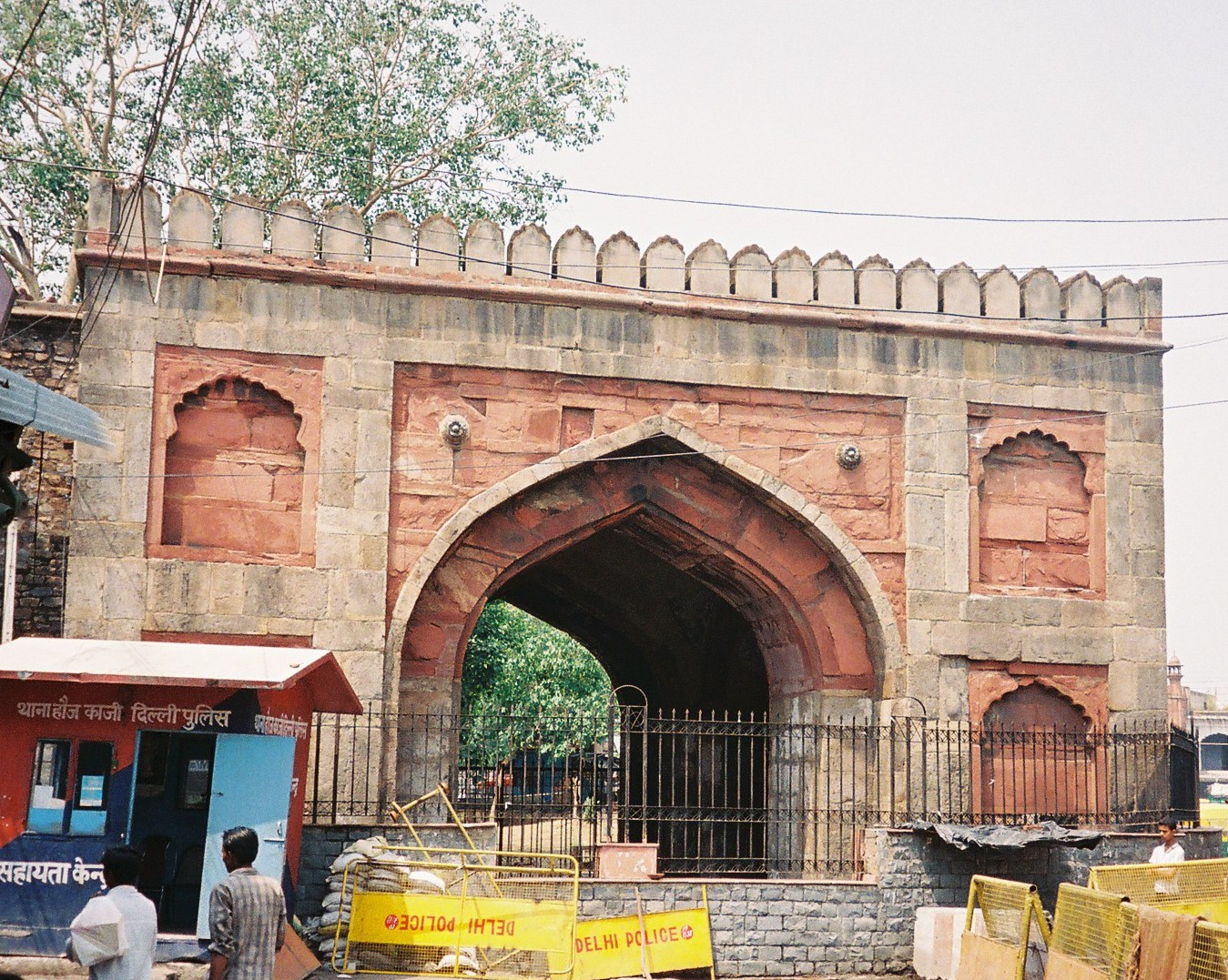
Ajmeri Gate, Delhi

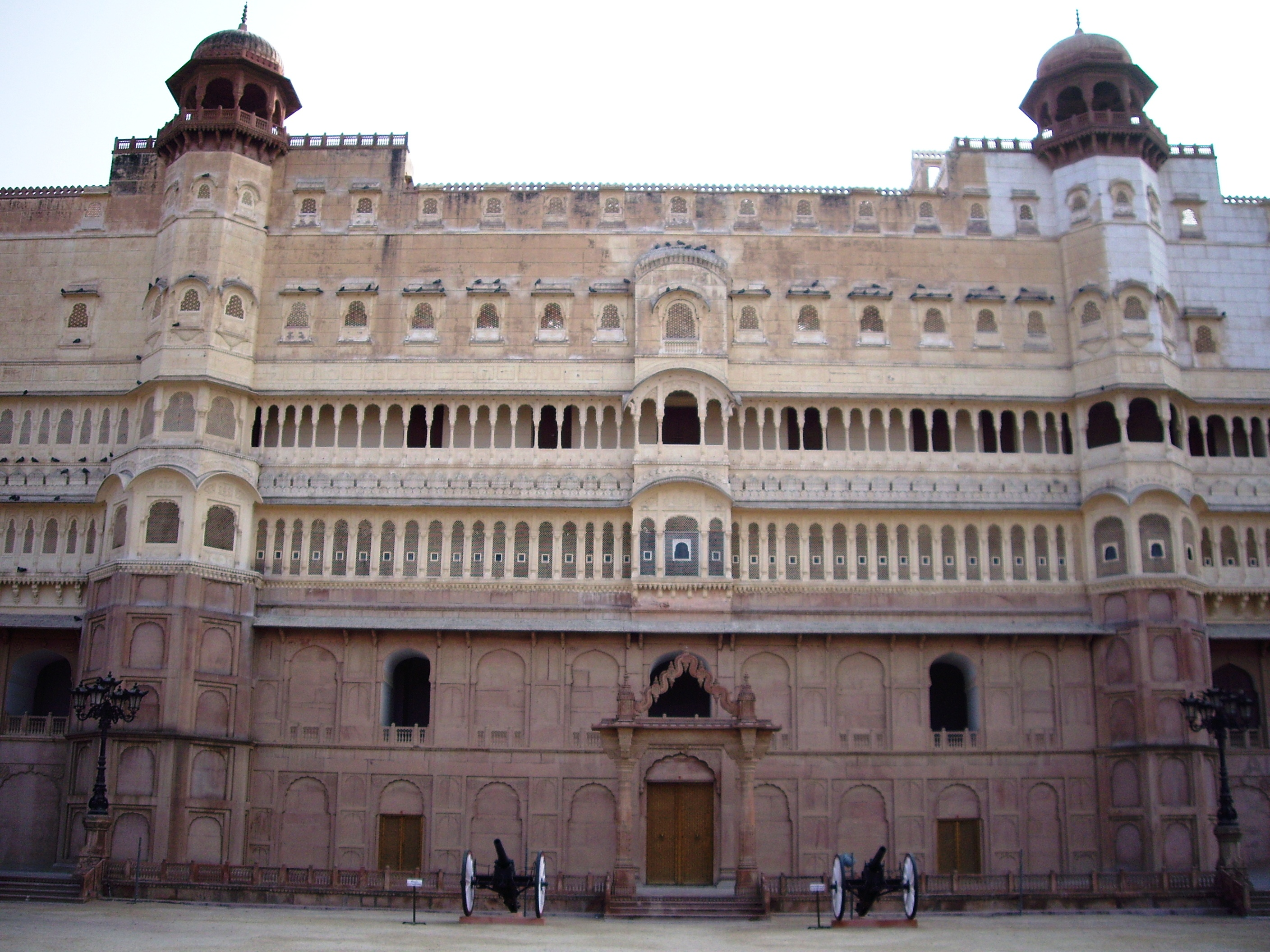
Entrance Eastern Façade of Junagarh Fort, Bikaner

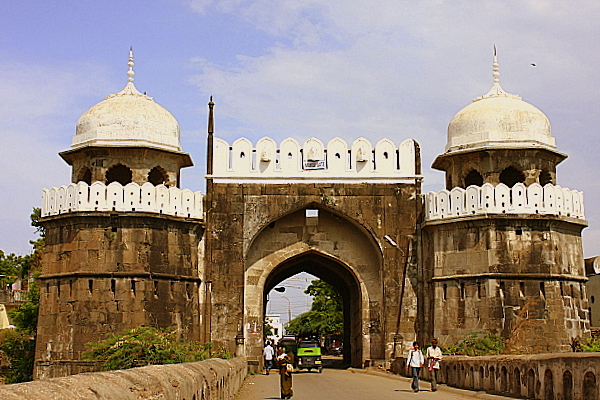
Makai Gate, Aurangabad

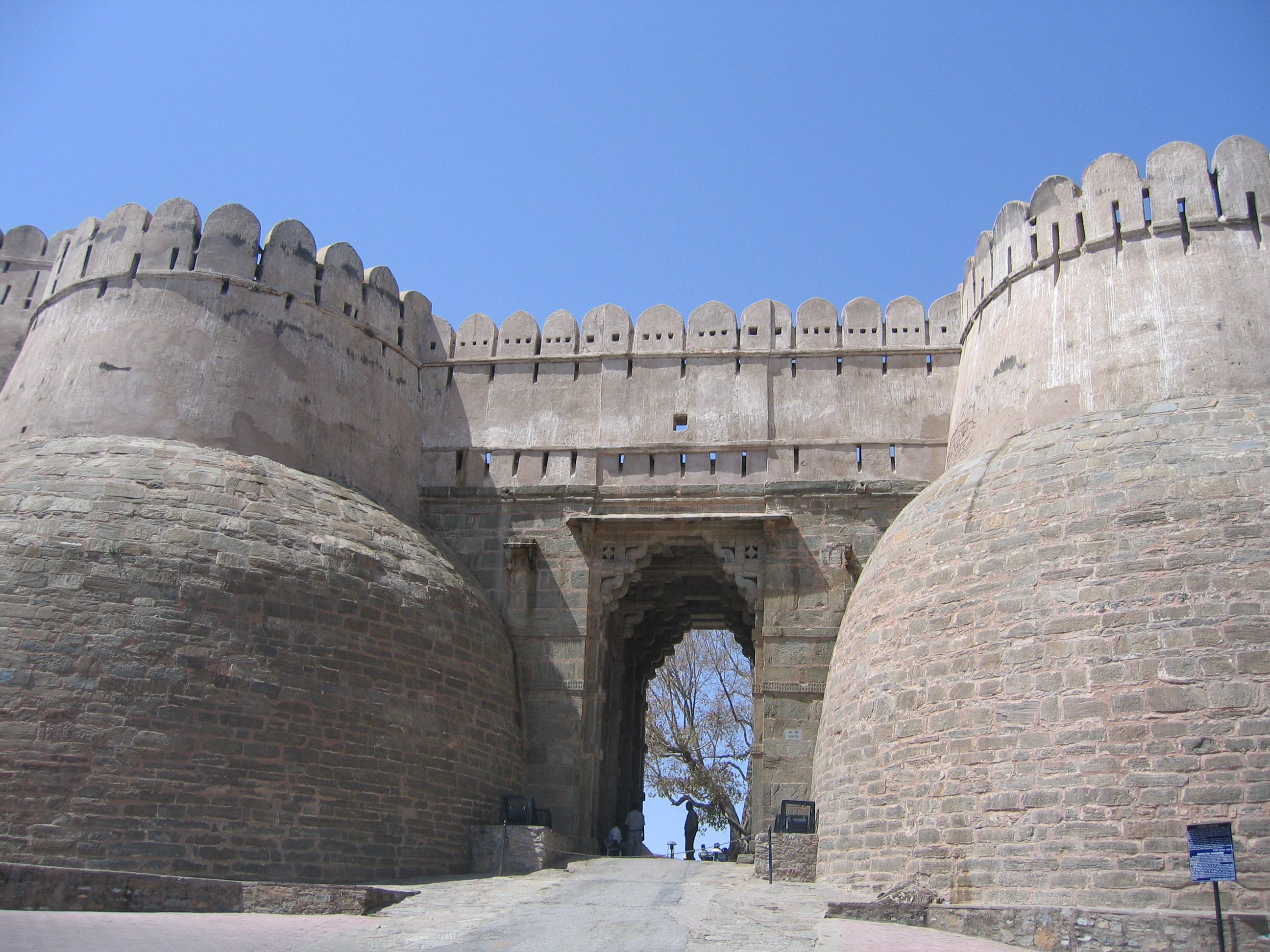
The massive gate of Kumbhalgarh fort, called the Ram Pol

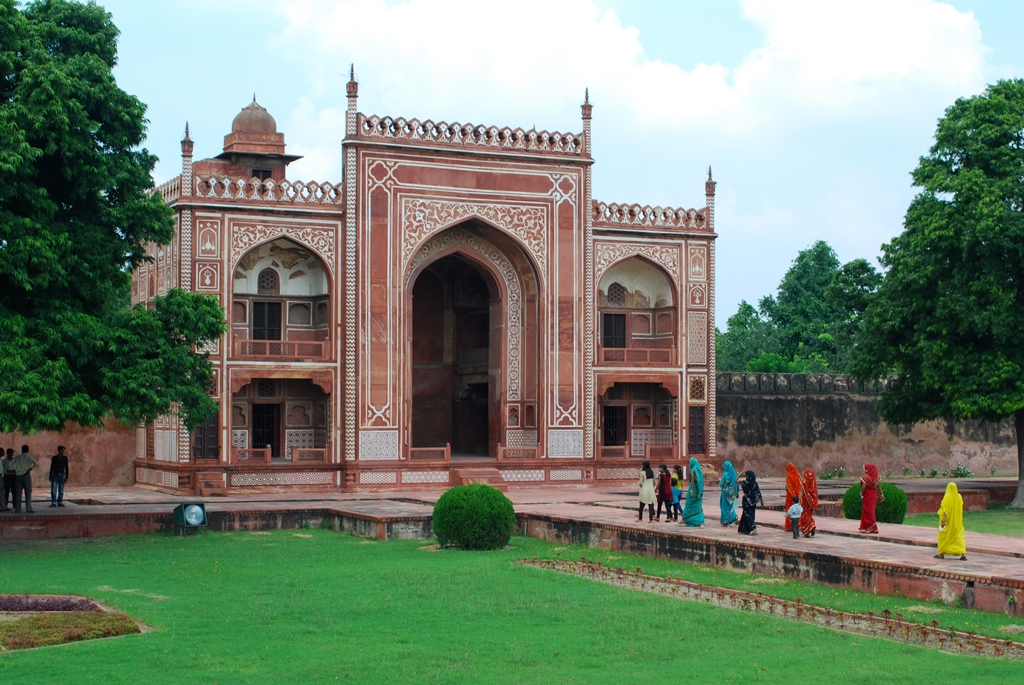
Entrance Gate from Interior Itmad-ud-Daula, Agra

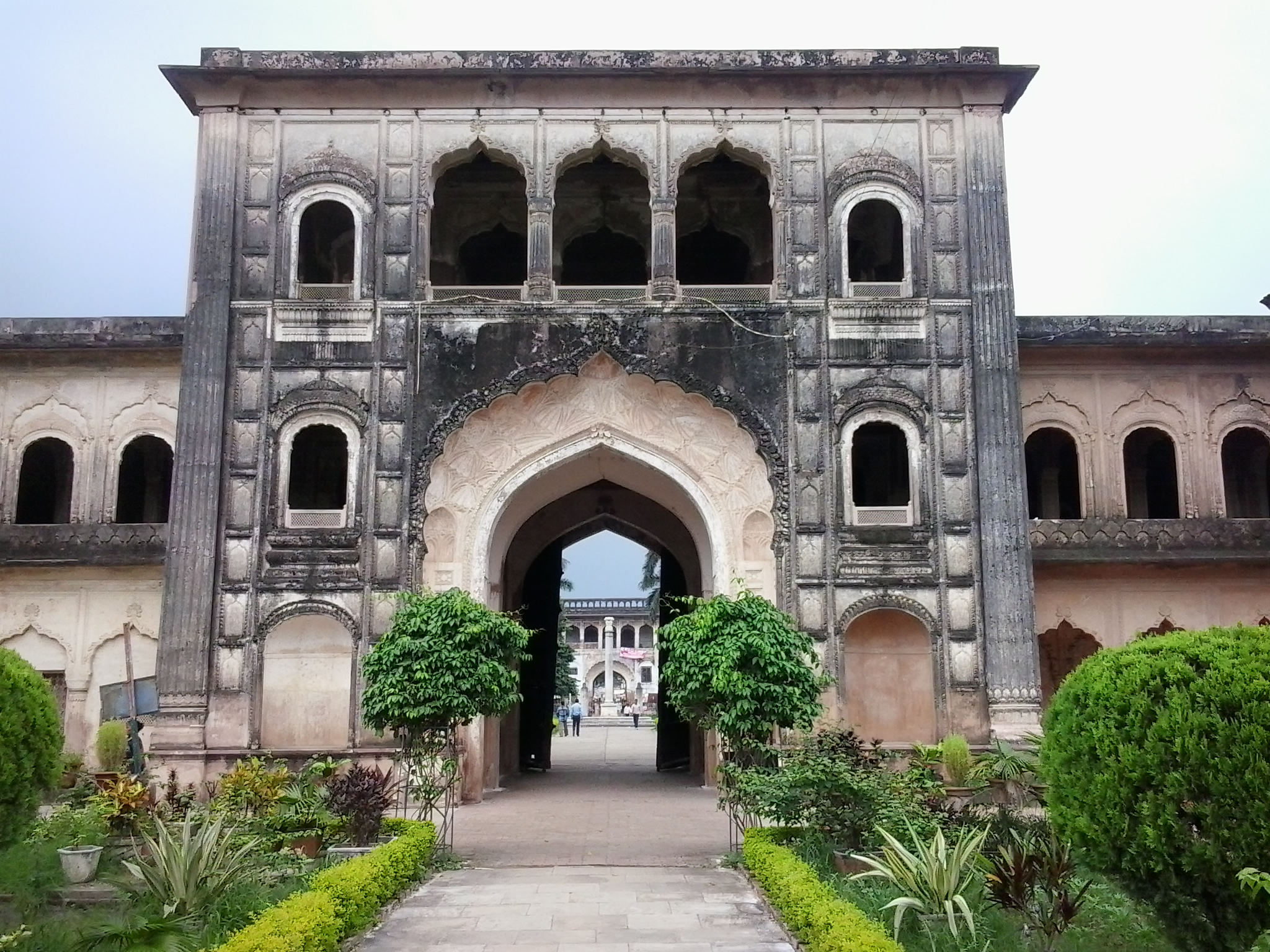
Gate to Gulab Bari, Faizabad

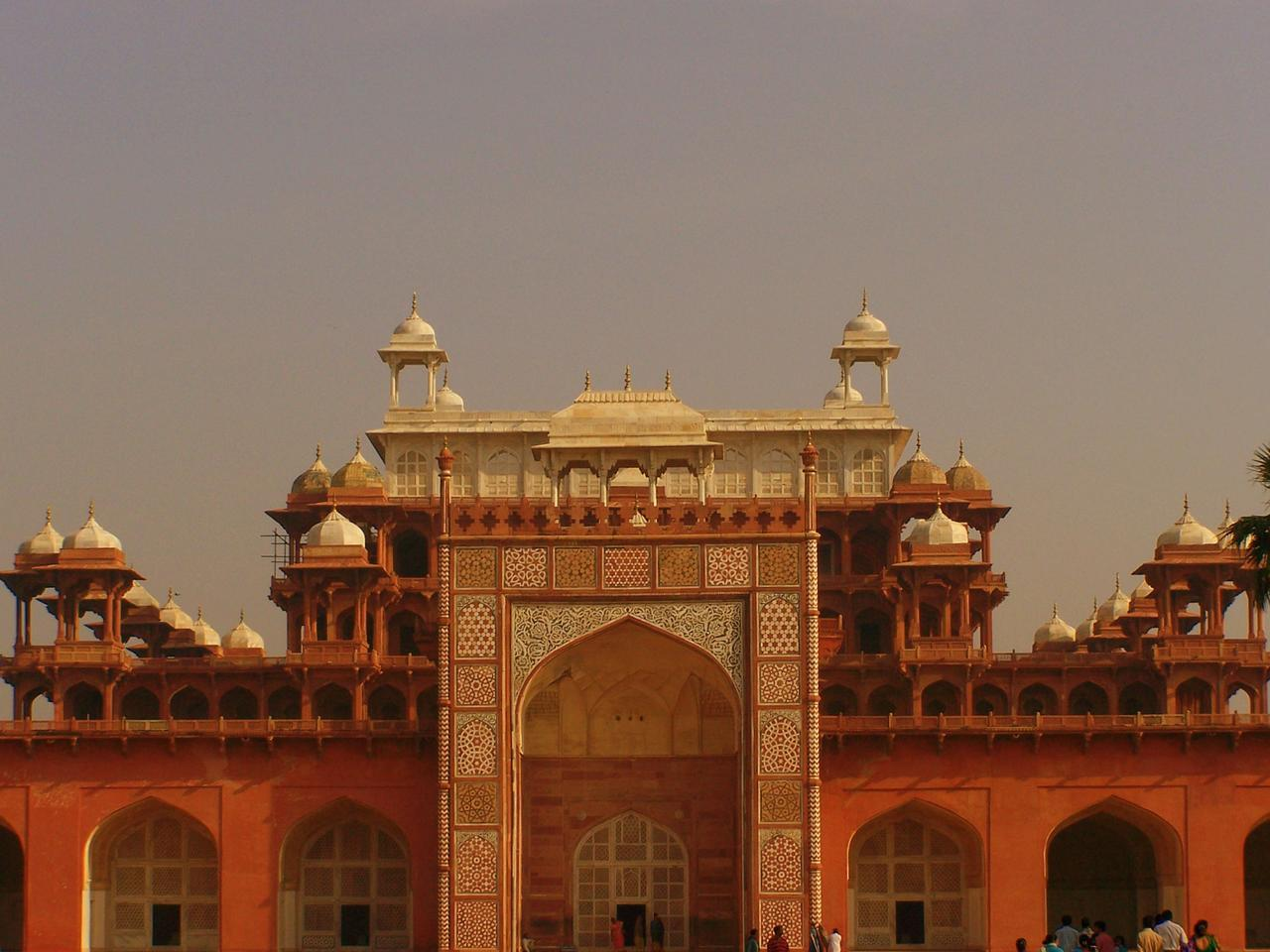
Entrance of Akbar's Tomb, Agra

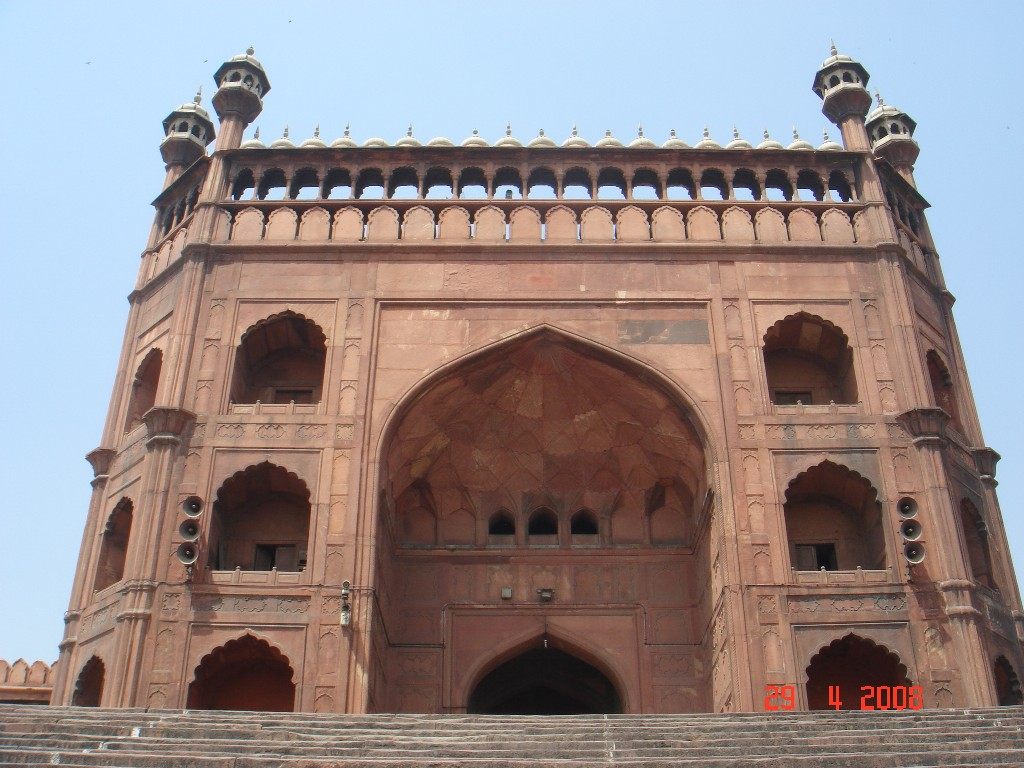
Jama Masjid Gate, Delhi

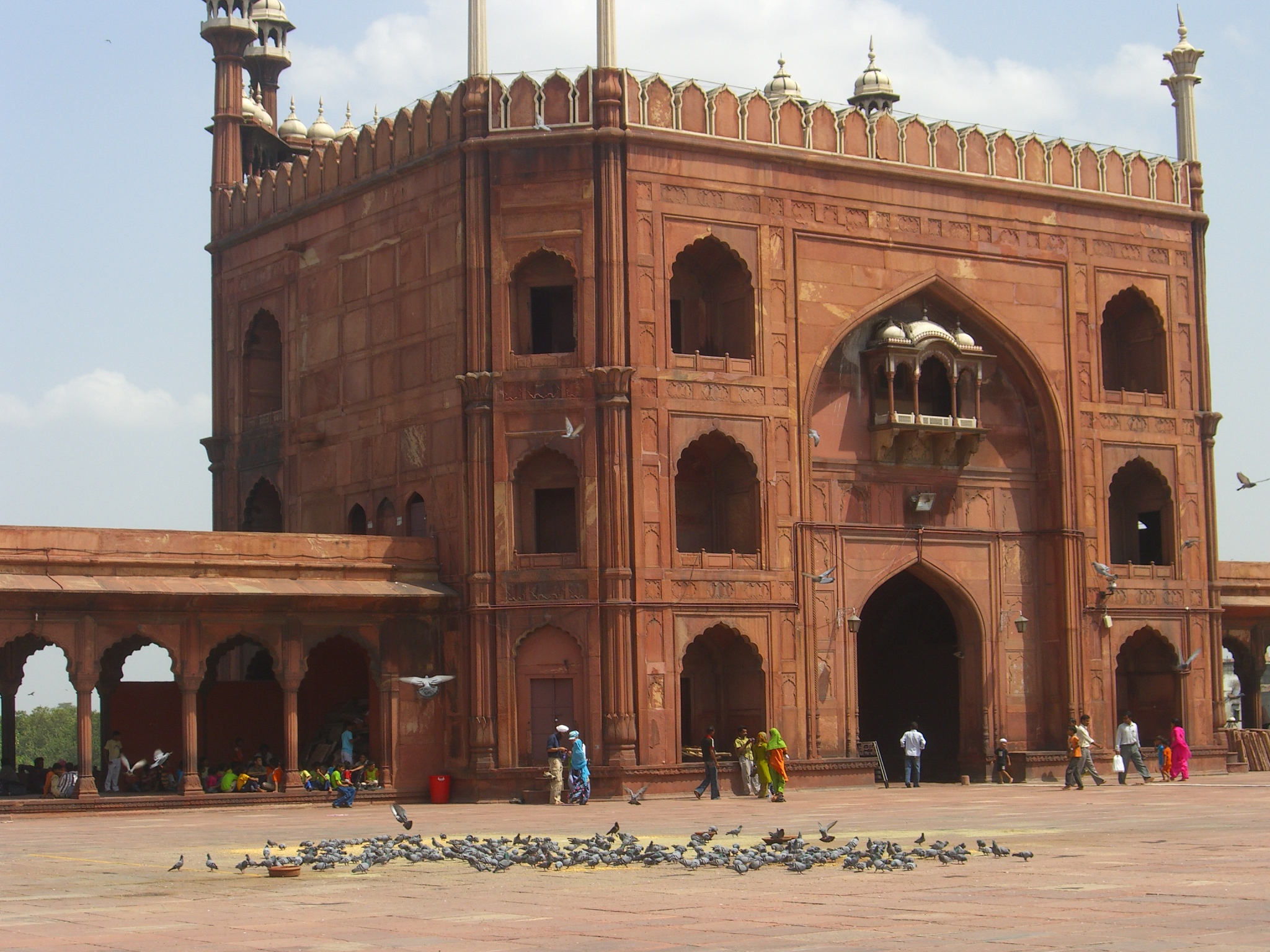
Jama Masjid Gate Inside, Delhi

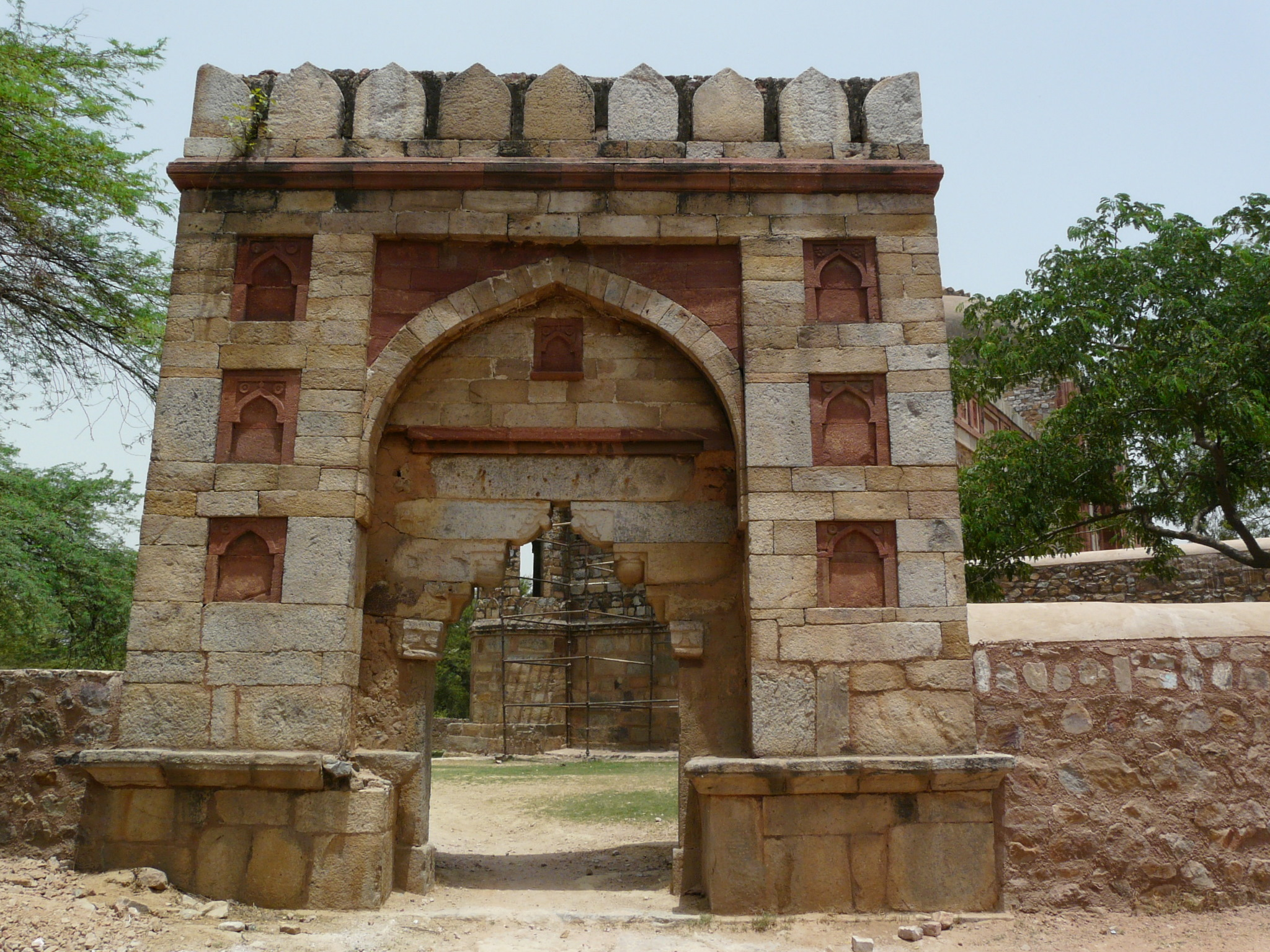
Jamali Kamali Entrance, Mehrauli, Delhi

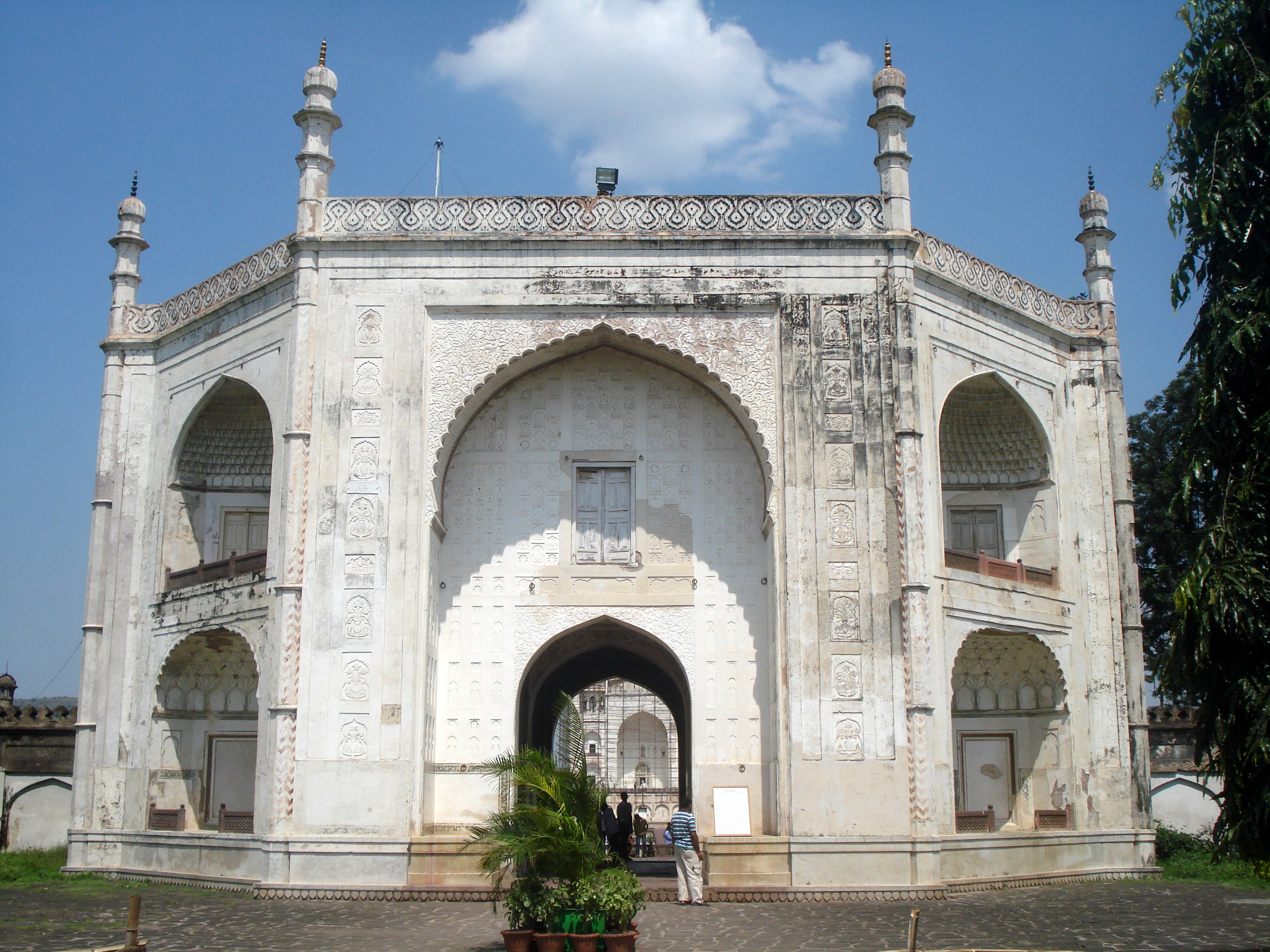
Entrance to Bibi-Ka-Maqbara, Aurangabad

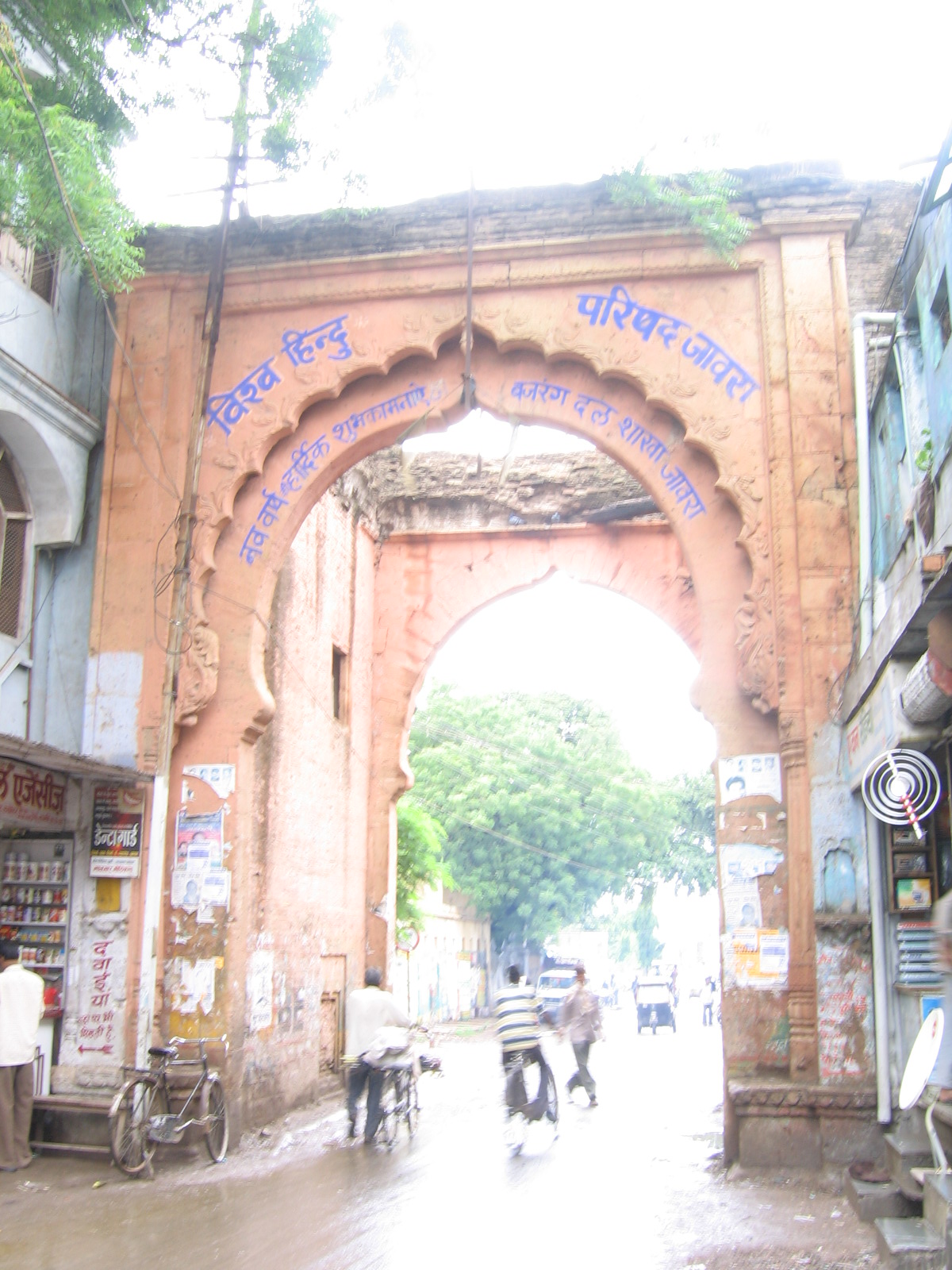
Ratlami Gate, Jaora

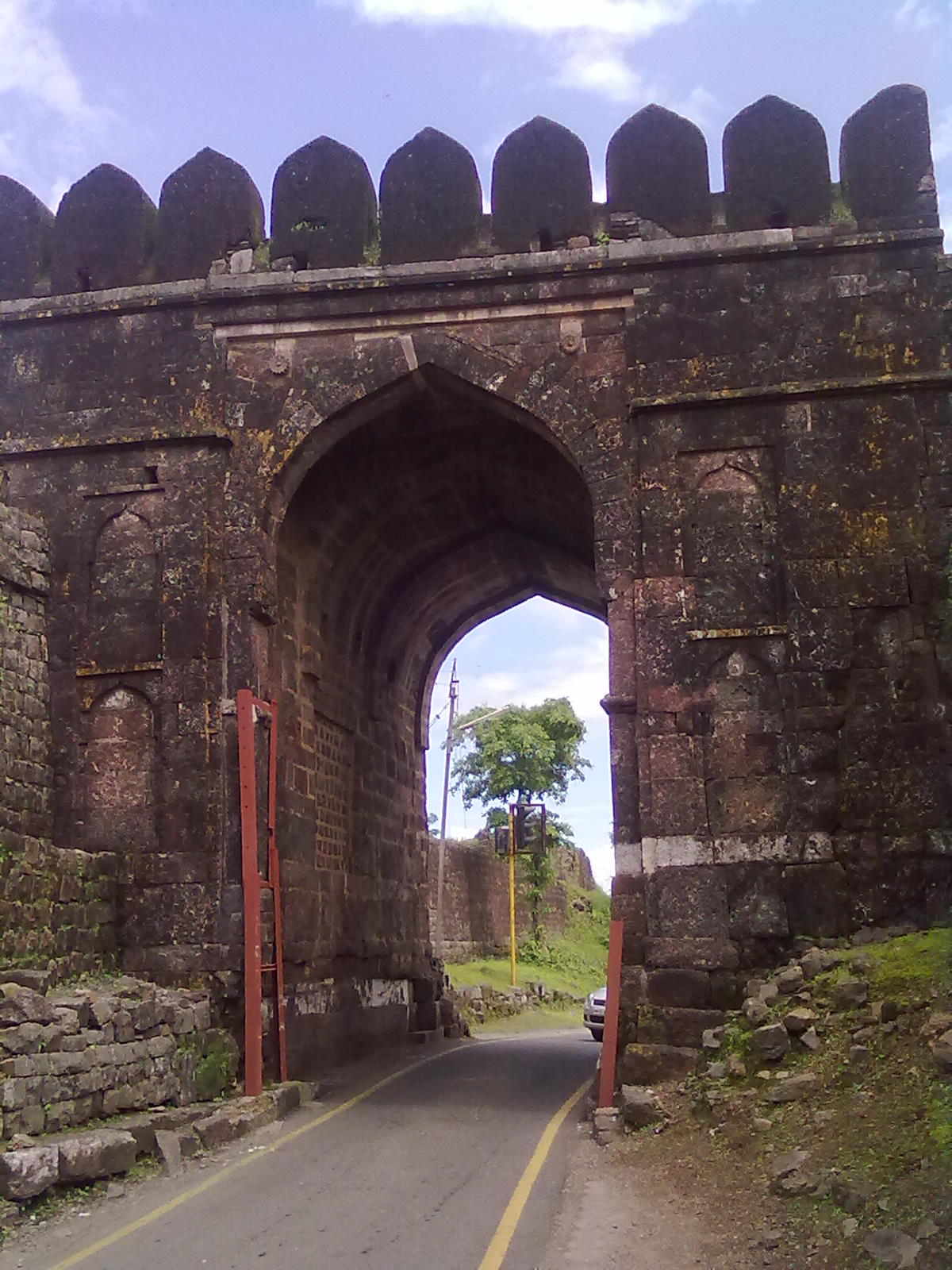
Alamgir Darwaza, Mandu

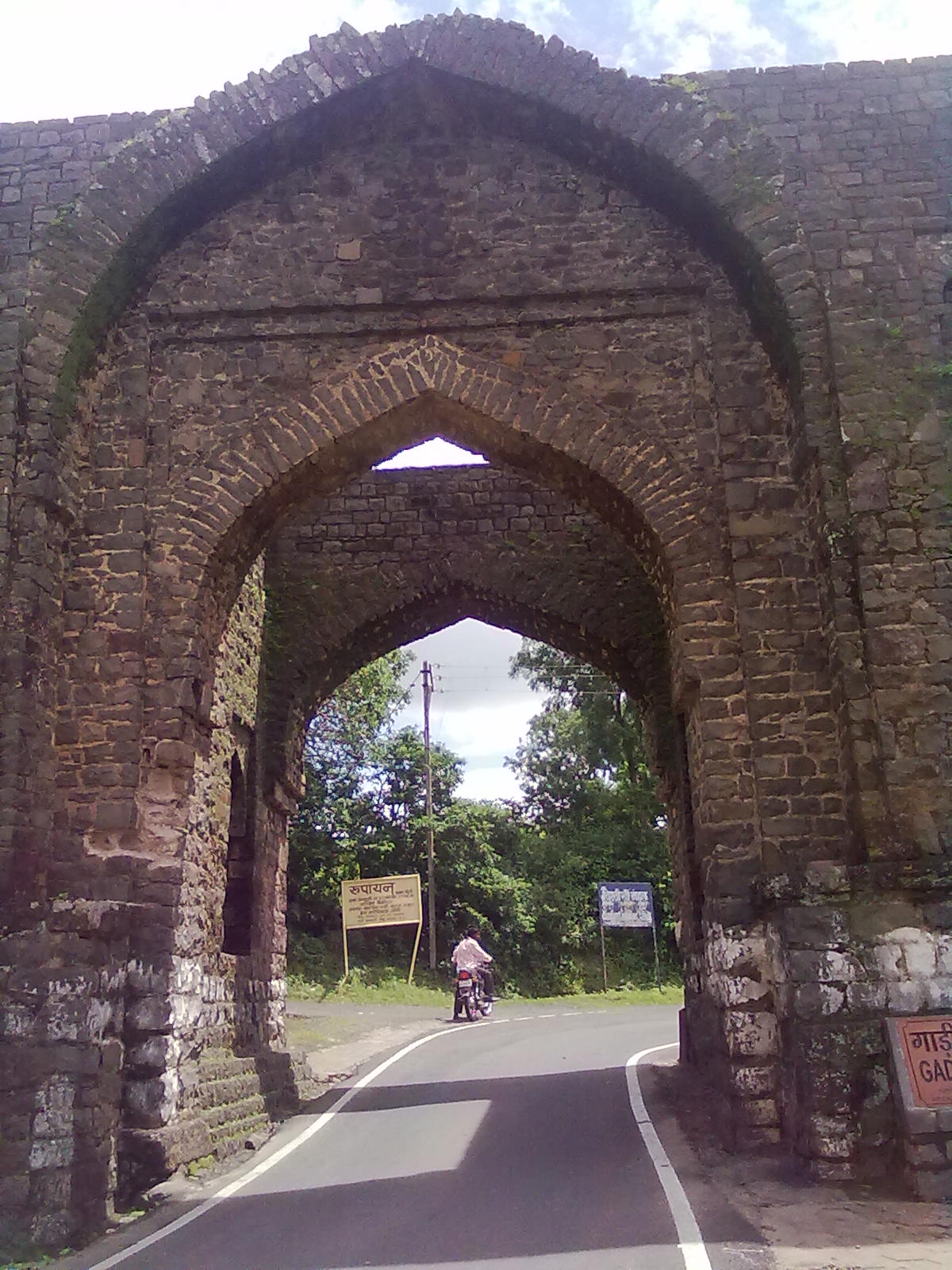
Gadi Darwaza, Mandu

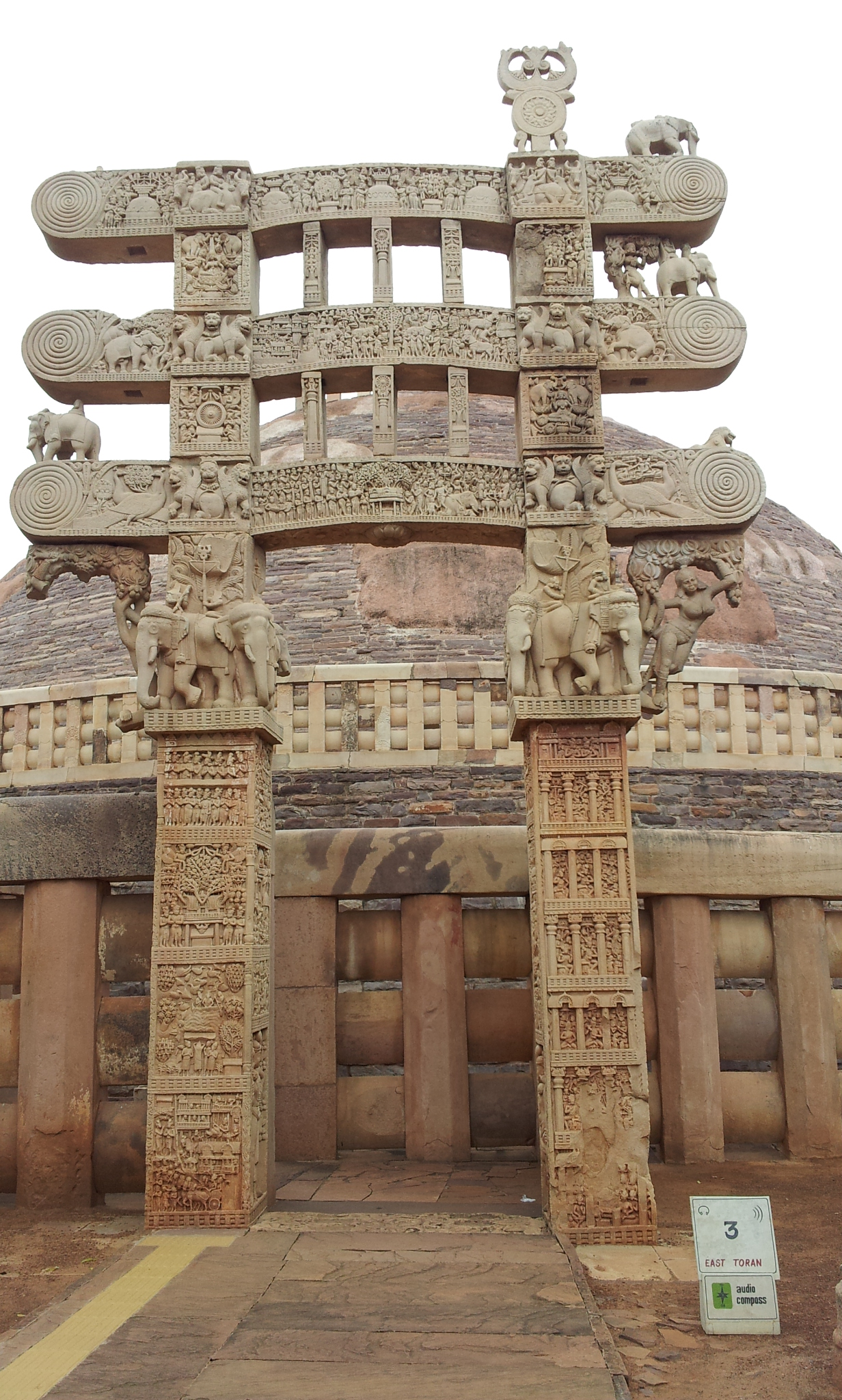
East Toran, Sanchi

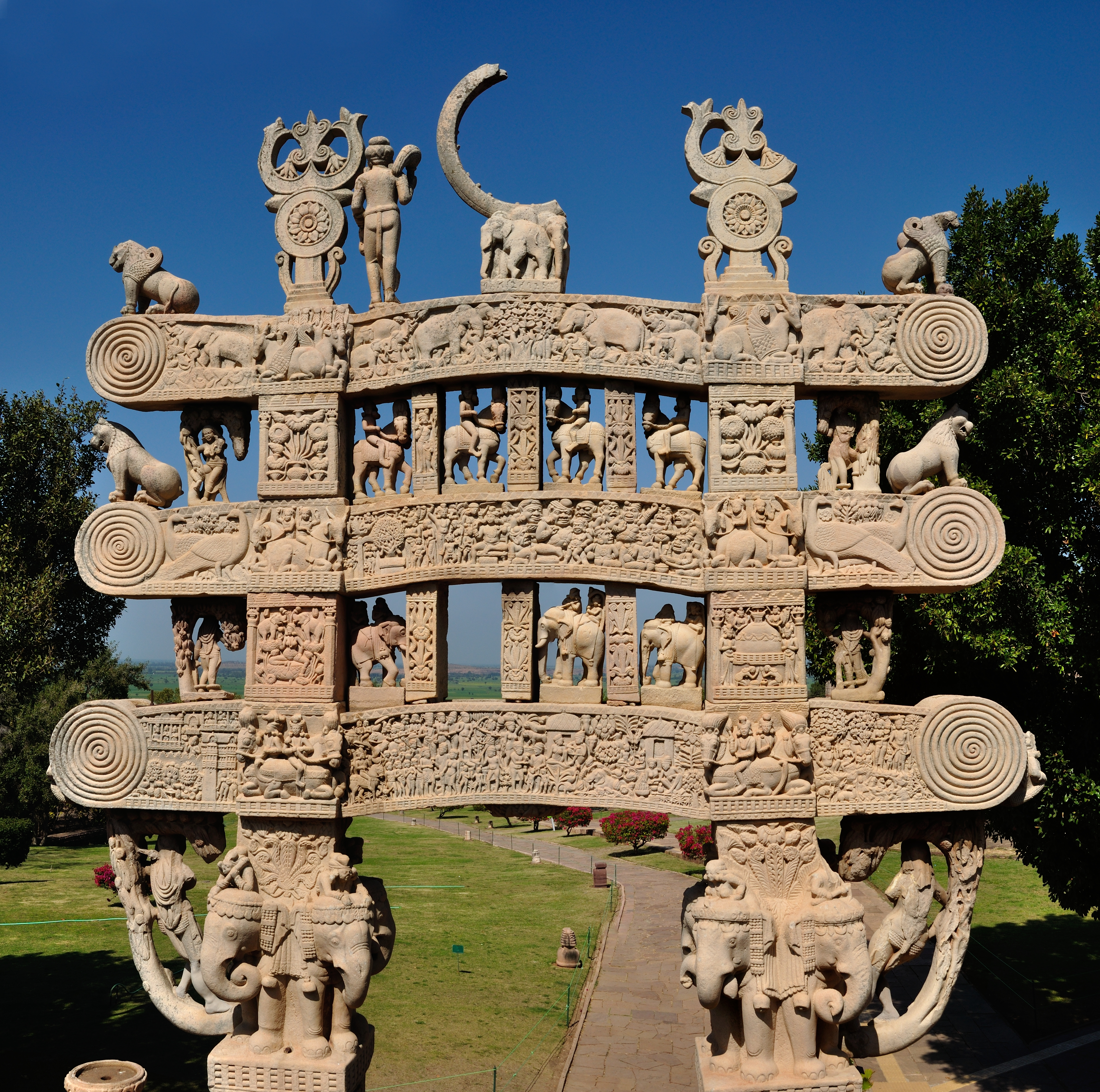
North Toran, Sanchi

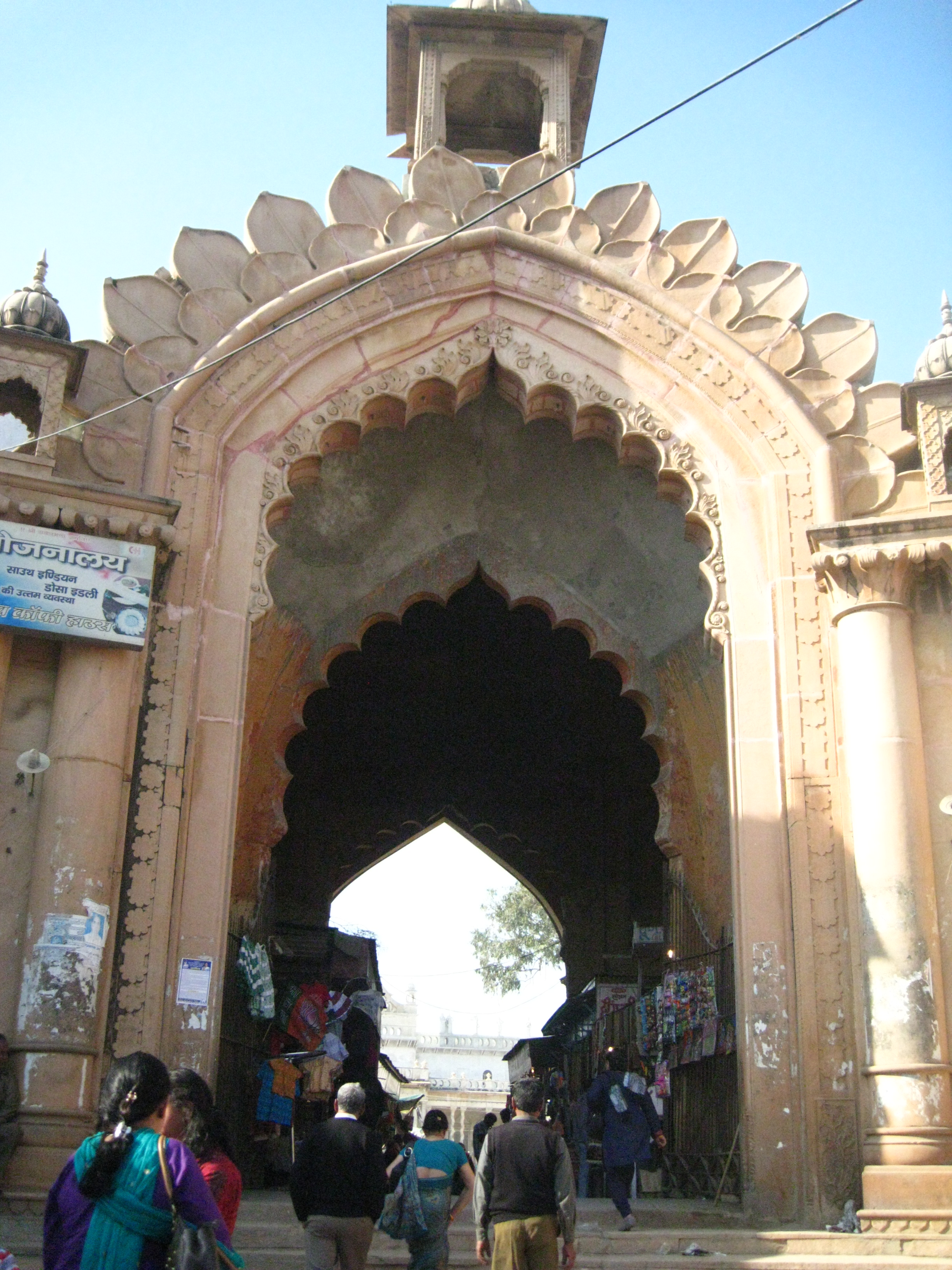
Shahji Temple Gate, Vrindavan

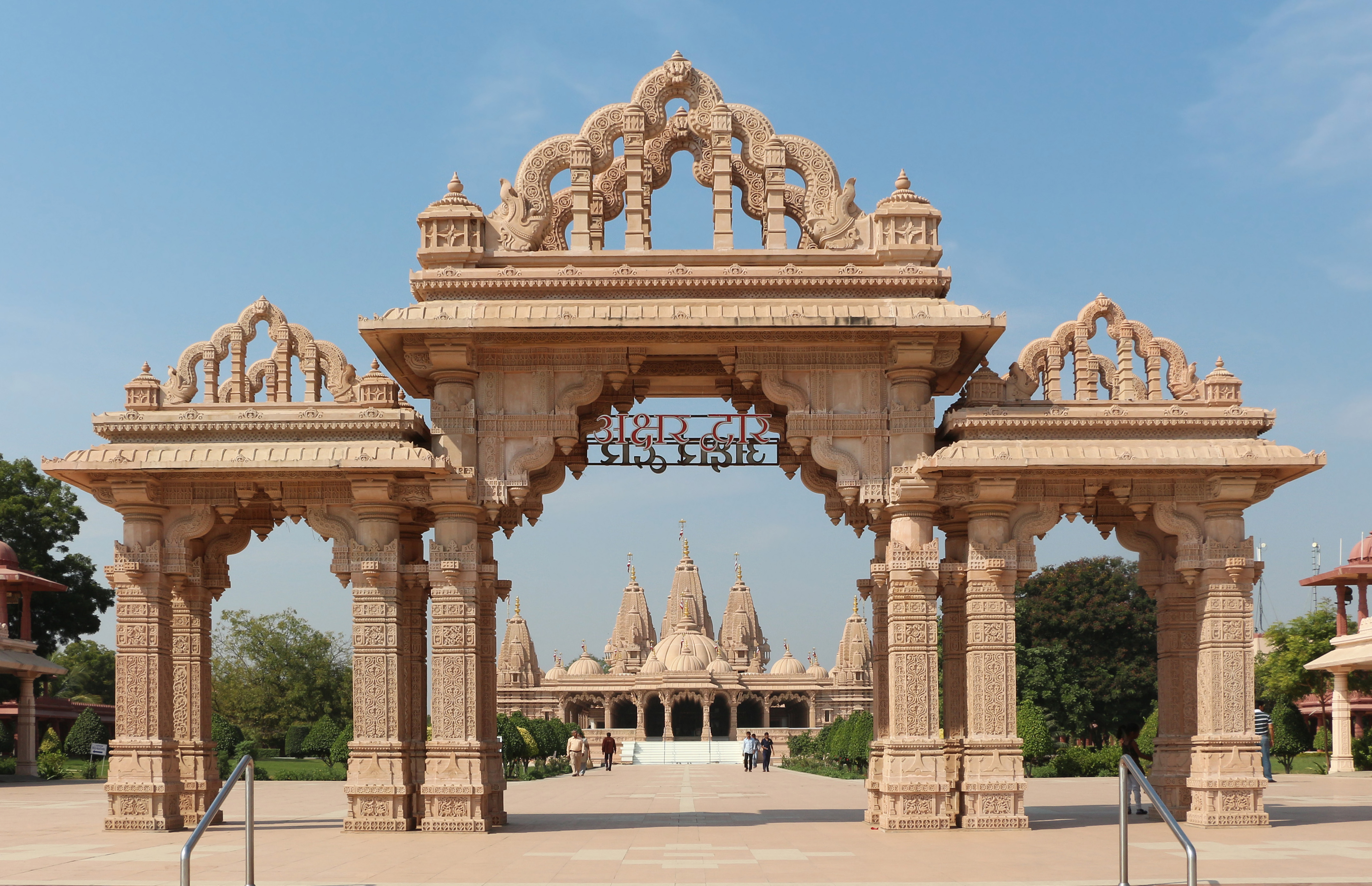
Akshardwar, Bhavnagar

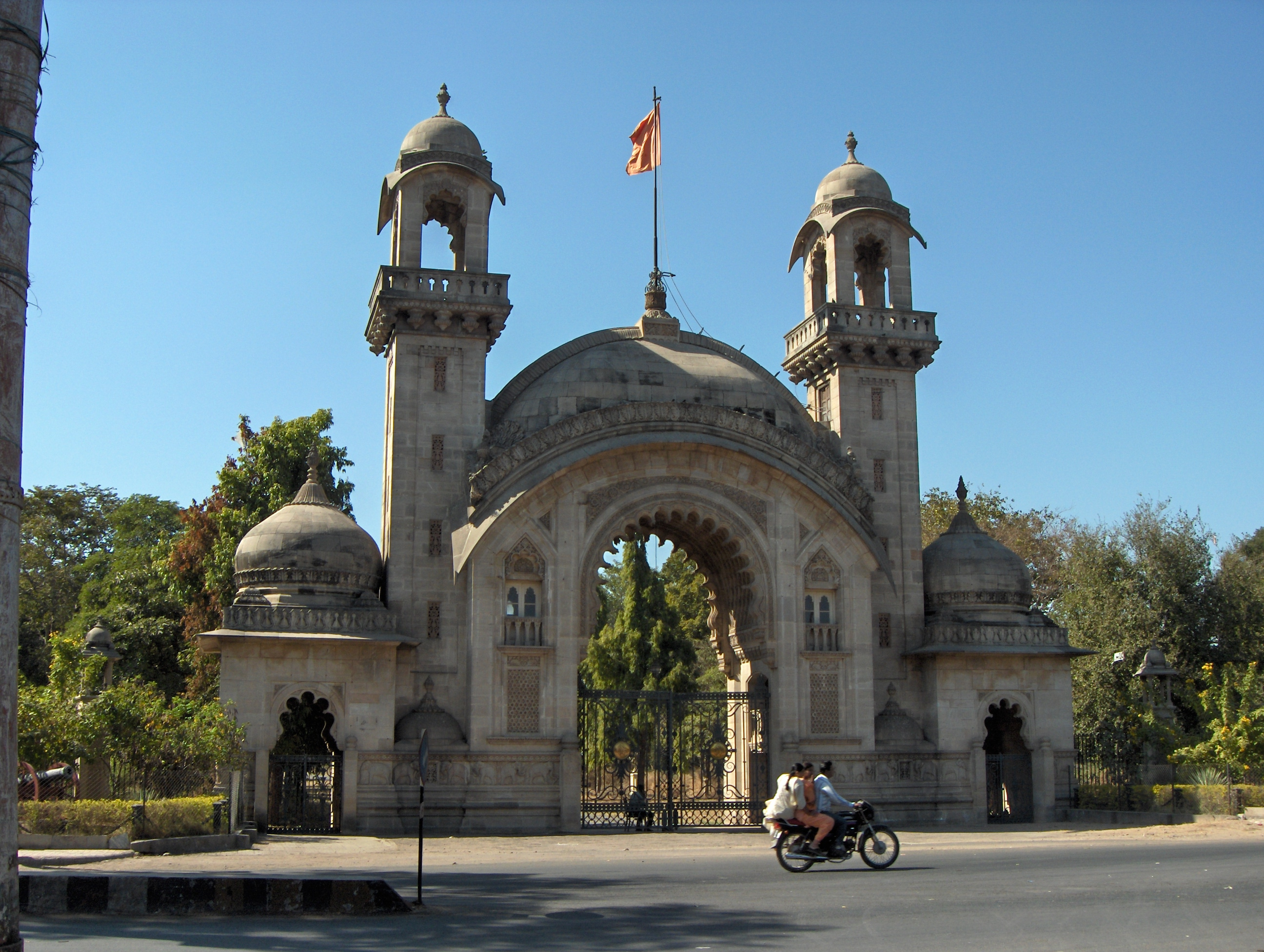
Sayajirao Palace Gate, Vadodara

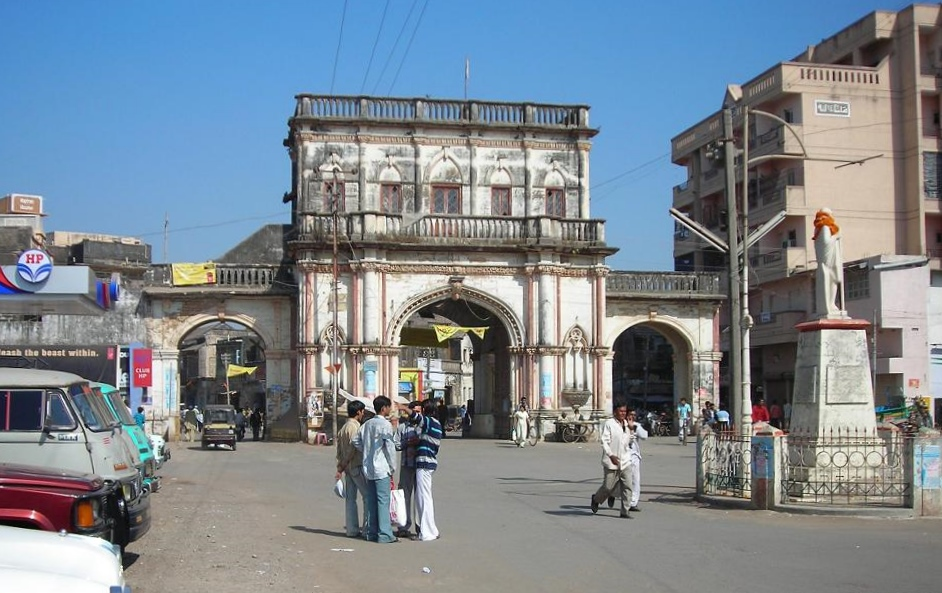
Teen Darwaza, Dhoraji

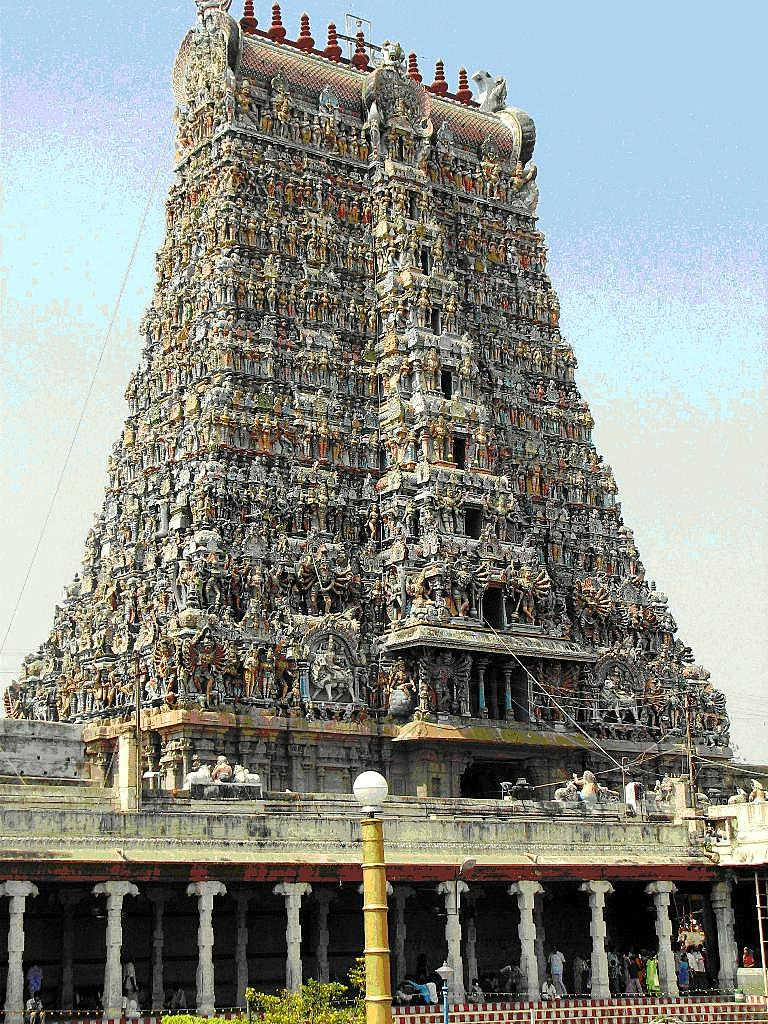
Gopuram, Meenakshiamman Temple

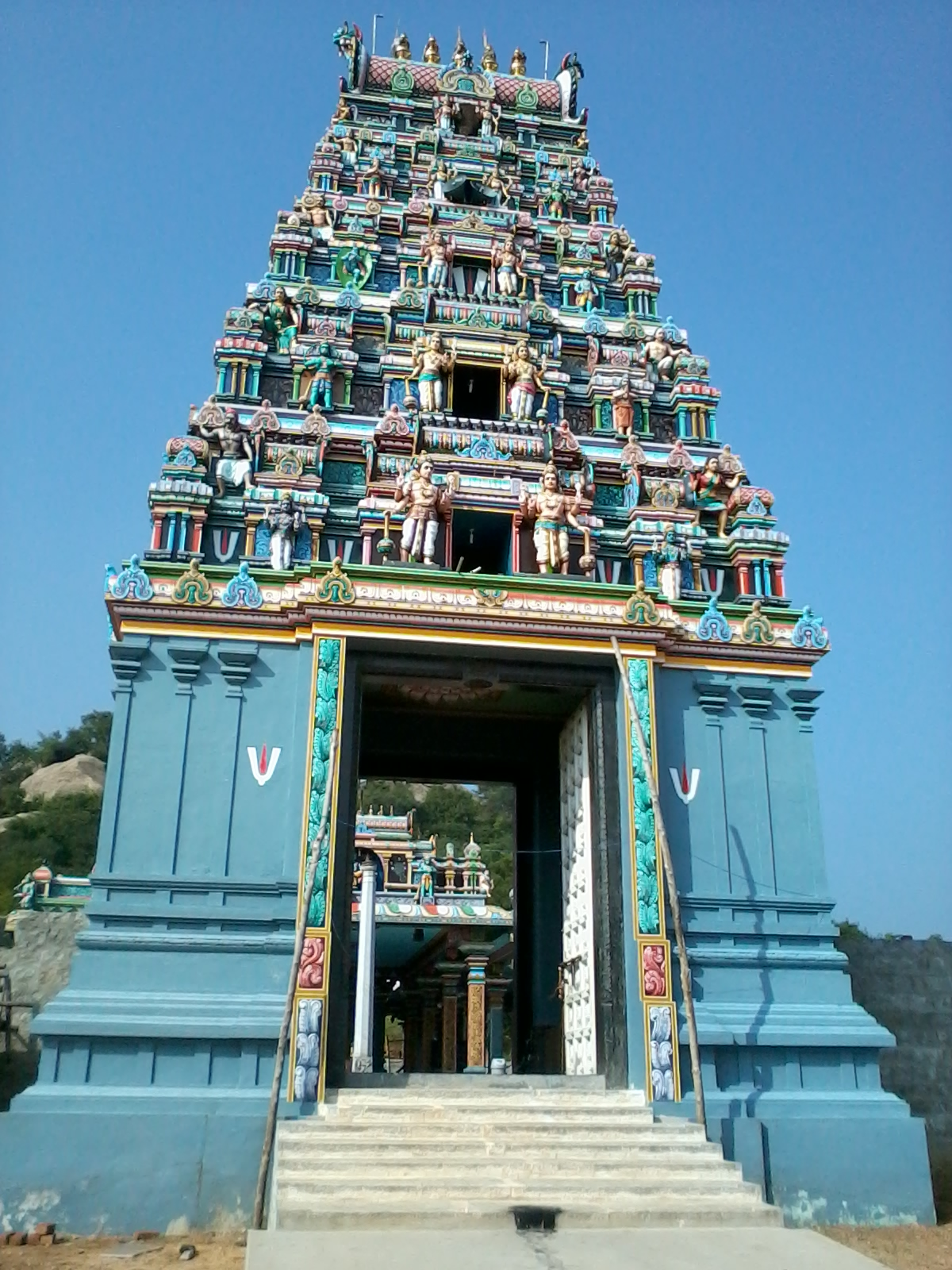
Gopuram, Sri Veera Vijaya Anjaneya Swami Temple, Paradarami

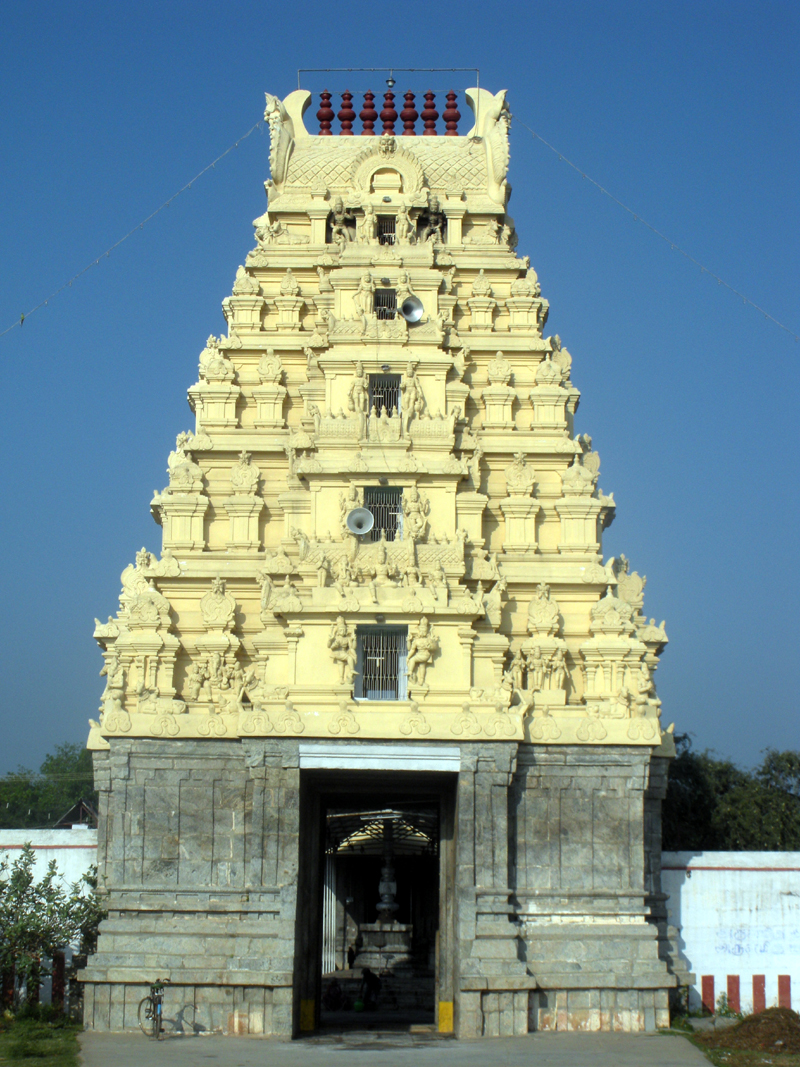
Gopuram, Thirumarperu, Tirumalpur

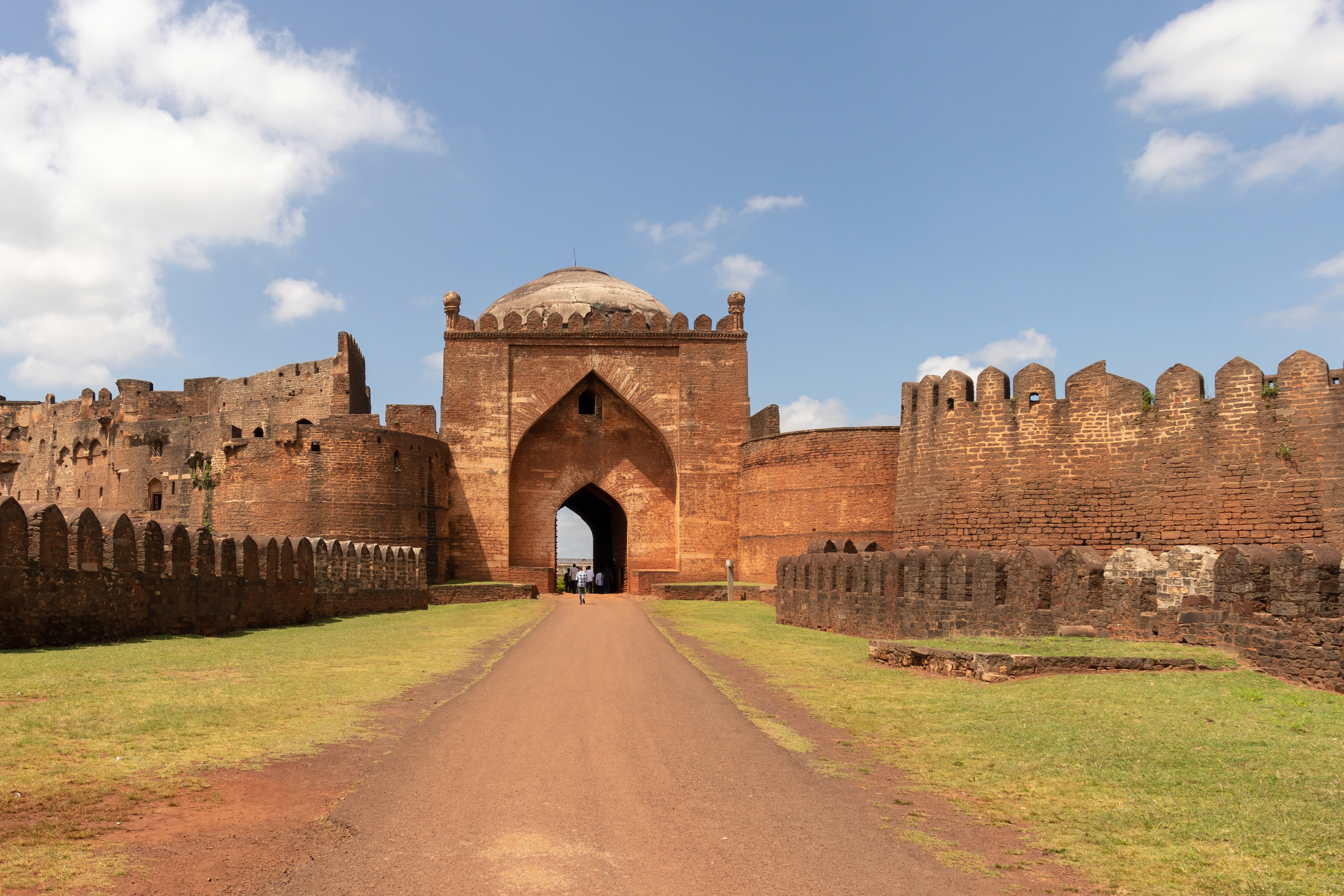
Gateway to Bidar fort

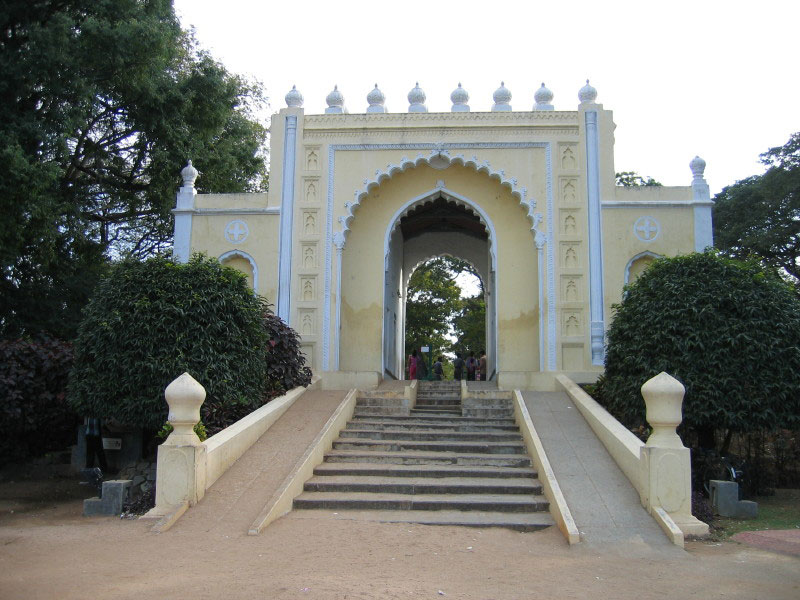
Daria Daulat Bagh Gate, Srirangapatna

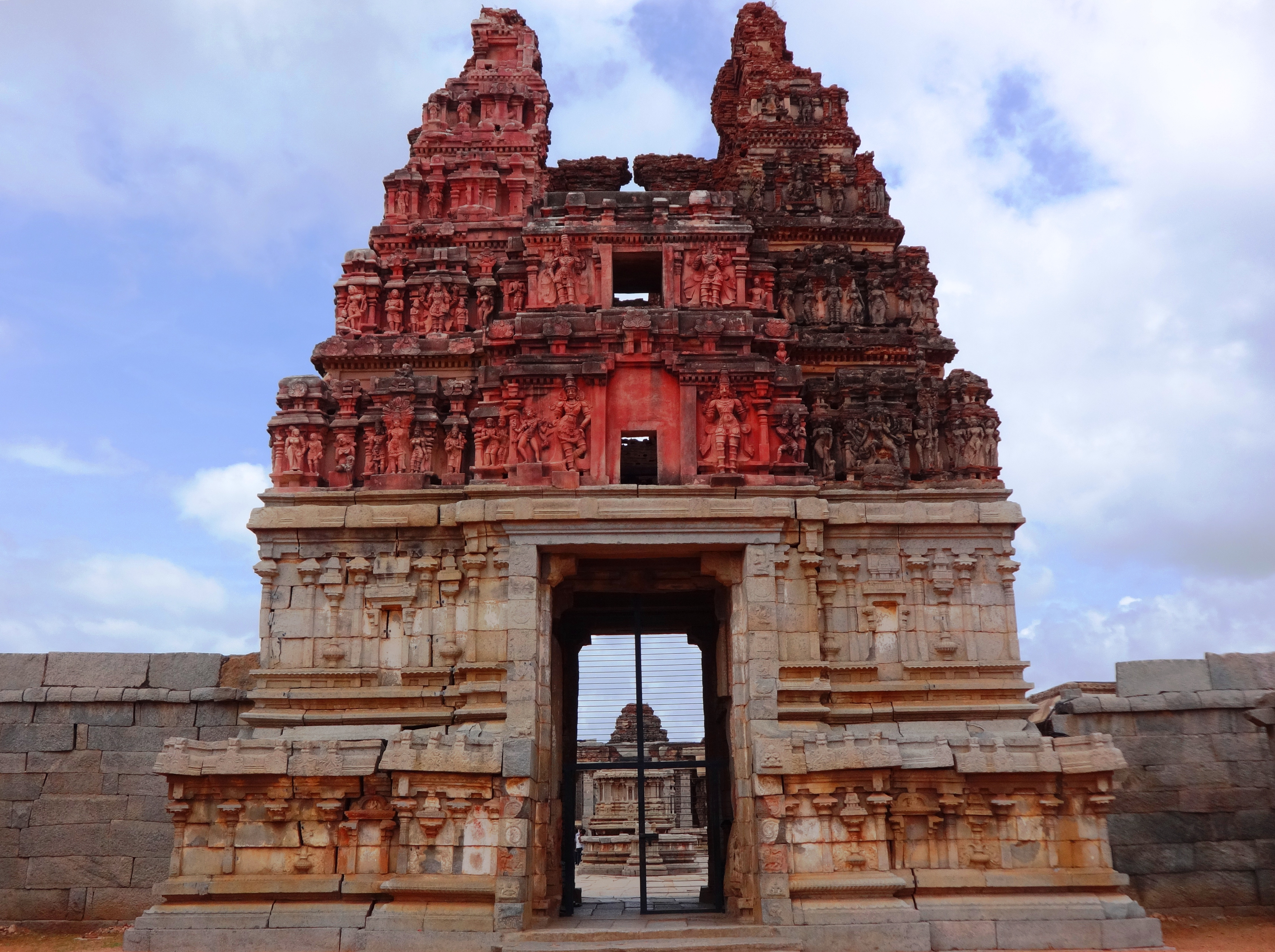
Vittala Temple Gate, Hampi

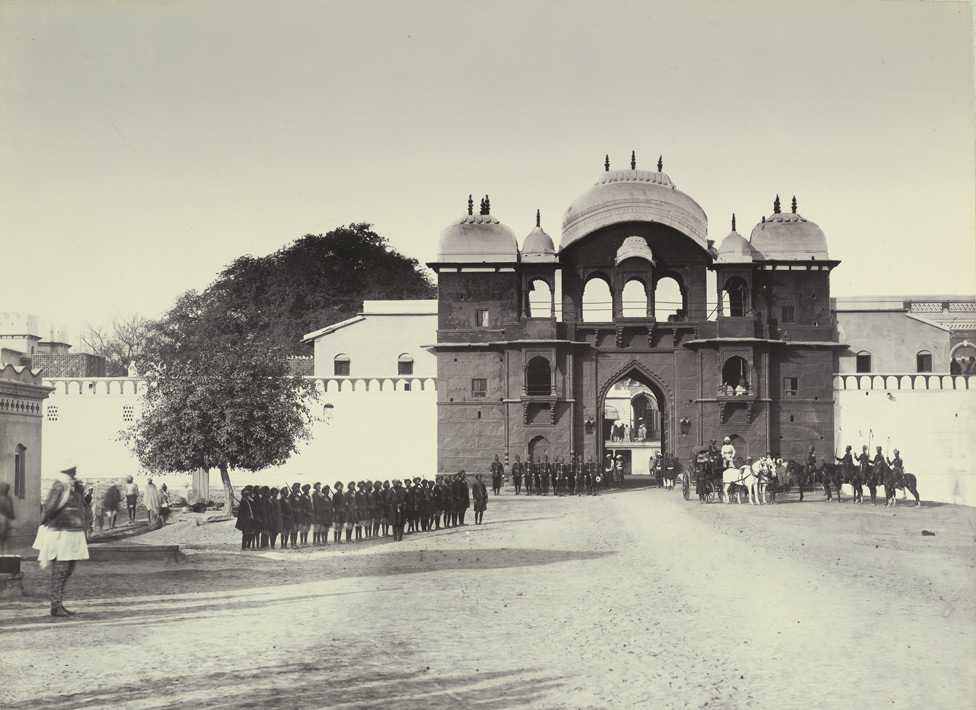
Laal Darwaza, Ramnagar Fort, Varanasi

== See also ==
- Fort and Gates of Ahmedabad
- Gates in Aurangabad, Maharashtra
- Gates of Delhi
