= Lukochuri Darwaza =

Monument in Gaur, West Bengal

- লুকোচুরি দরওয়াজা
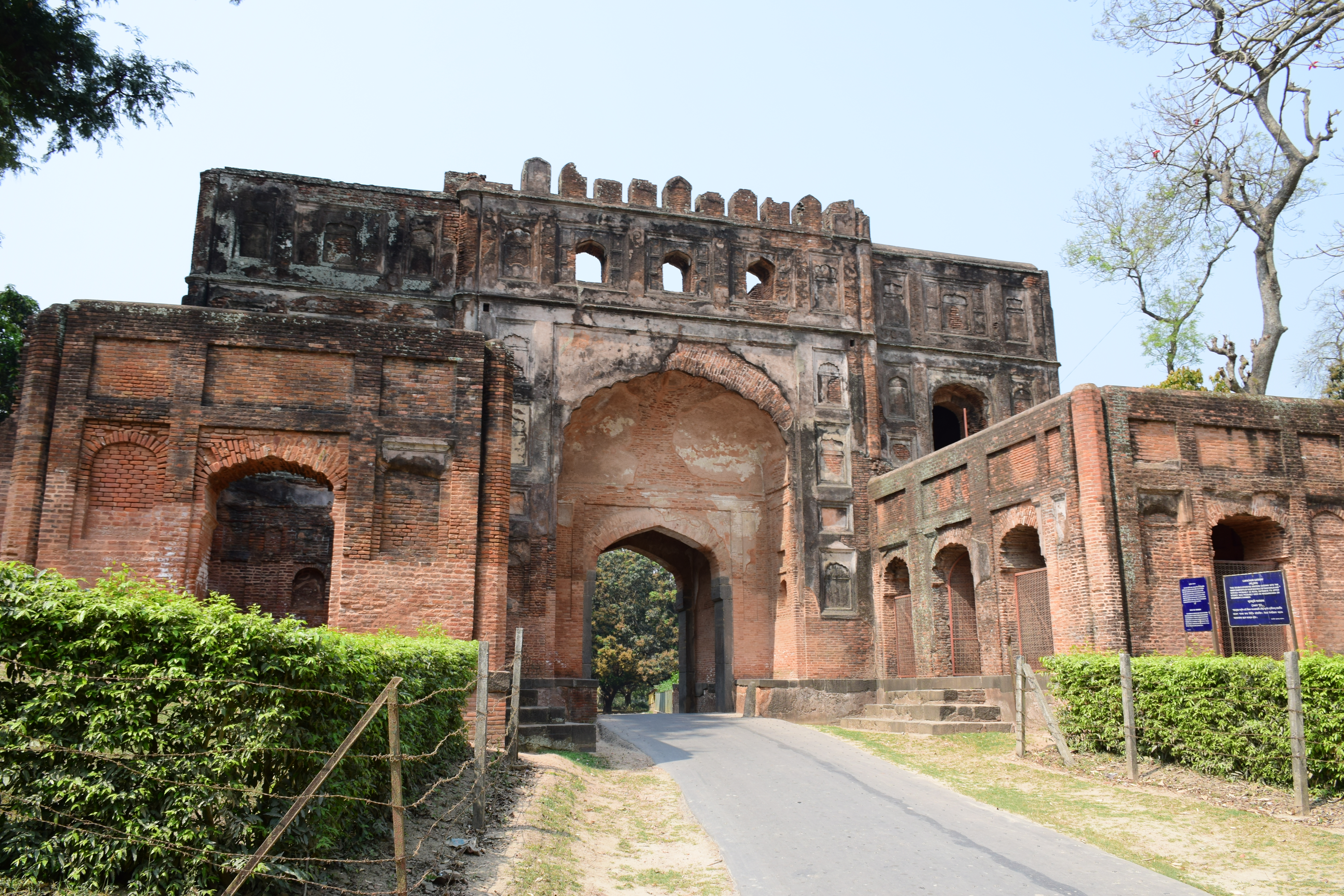
- Façade of the gate in 2018

- Location within West Bengal

General information
- Type: Gate
- Architectural style: Mughal Architecture
- Location: Gauda, Malda, West Bengal, India
- Coordinates: 24°52′07″N 88°07′55″E
- Completed: 1655; 371 years ago
- Governing body: Archaeology of India

Technical details
- Material: Brick
- Size: 255.42 m^{2} (2,749.3 sq ft)

Monument of National Importance
- Official name: Lukachori Darwaza
- Reference no.: N-WB-93

Lukochuri Darwaza (Note: also spelled Lukochori and Lukachuri) (Bengali: লুকোচুরি দরওয়াজা, lit. 'Hide and Seek Gate') is a historic Mughal-era gateway in Gaur, Malda, West Bengal, India. It is situated on north of Gumti Gate and southeast of the Qadam Rasul Mosque. It was built around the 17th century, likely under Mughal prince Shah Shuja. This three-storeyed tripartite gate has a central four-pointed arch flanked on either side by arched entrances two storeys high, features brick architecture with grand arches and served as an entrance to the Gaur citadel. Part of the ancient city's ruins, the monument is maintained by the Archaeological Survey of India.

== History ==
Shah Shuja is believed to have constructed it in 1655, following the Mughal architectural style. However, some historians attribute its construction to Alauddin Husain Shah in 1522. It is also noted that Shah Shuja frequently visited his patron saint, Shah Niamatullah Wali, who lived in the Firuzpur (in Chapainawabganj) quarters in the southern part of the city of Lakhnauti. The structure likely shortened his travel and allowed him to pass through the city center, located toward the east and south of the gateway. It is also assumed that the Lukochuri Darwaza was designed specifically as an entrance to the Qadam Rasul Mosque.

== Architecture ==
The brick gateway, rectangular in shape, measures 19.80 m (65.0 ft) in length and 12.90 m (42.3 ft) in width. It stands three stories tall, featuring doorways on the first floor that mirror those below, with a flat roof above serving as a naqqar khana, used to announce the governor's arrival and departure from the citadel. The entire gate is crowned by kanjuras.

== Gallery ==
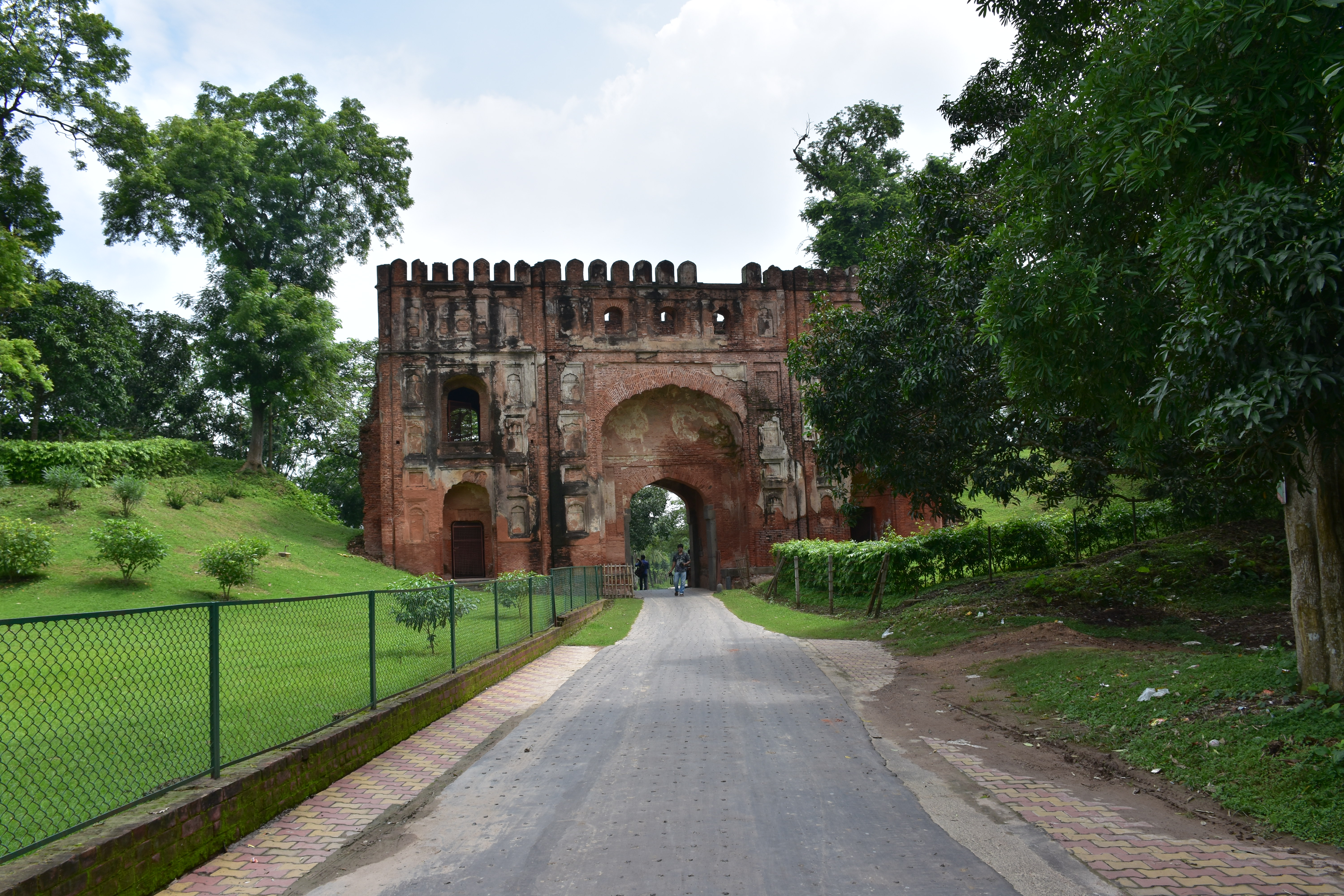
General view of the gate

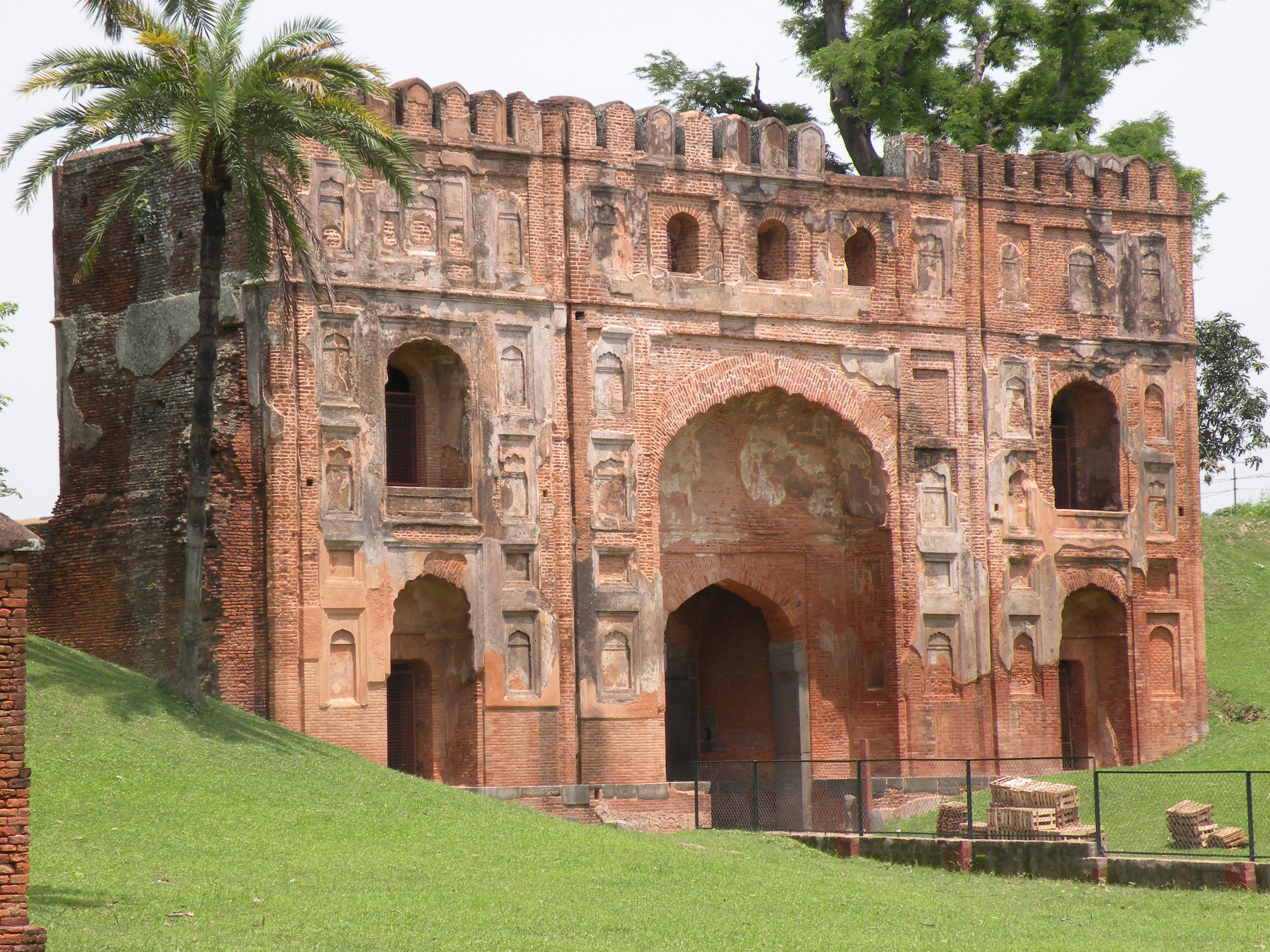
The gate with three stories

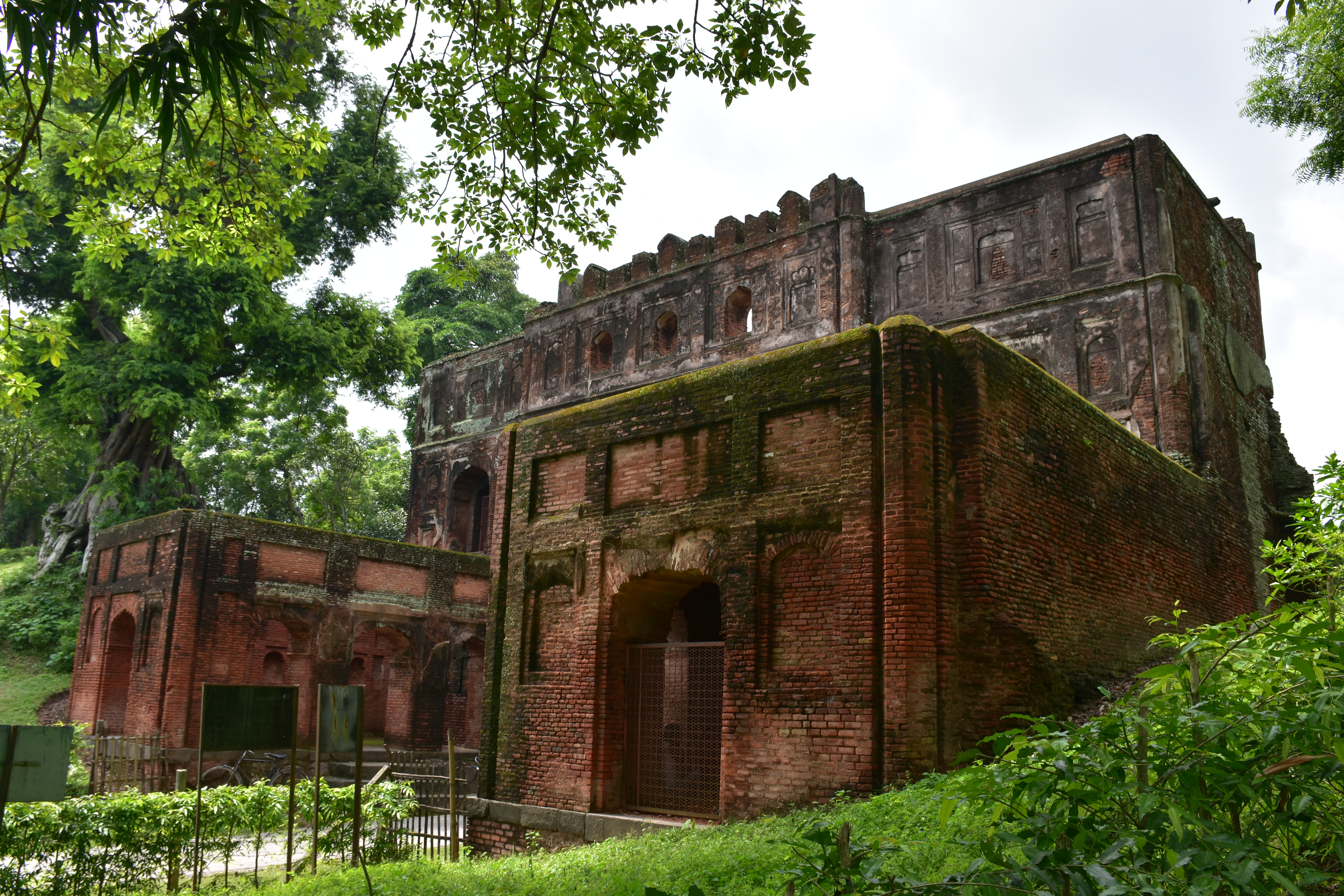
Opposite side of the gate

== See also ==
- Gumti Darwaza
- Dakhil Darwaza
- Kotwali Gate

== Bibliography ==
- Michell, George, ed. (1984). The Islamic Heritage of Bengal. Unesco. ISBN 978-92-3-102174-9.
