= Dakhil Darwaza =

Monument in Gaur, West Bengal

- দাখিল দরওয়াজা
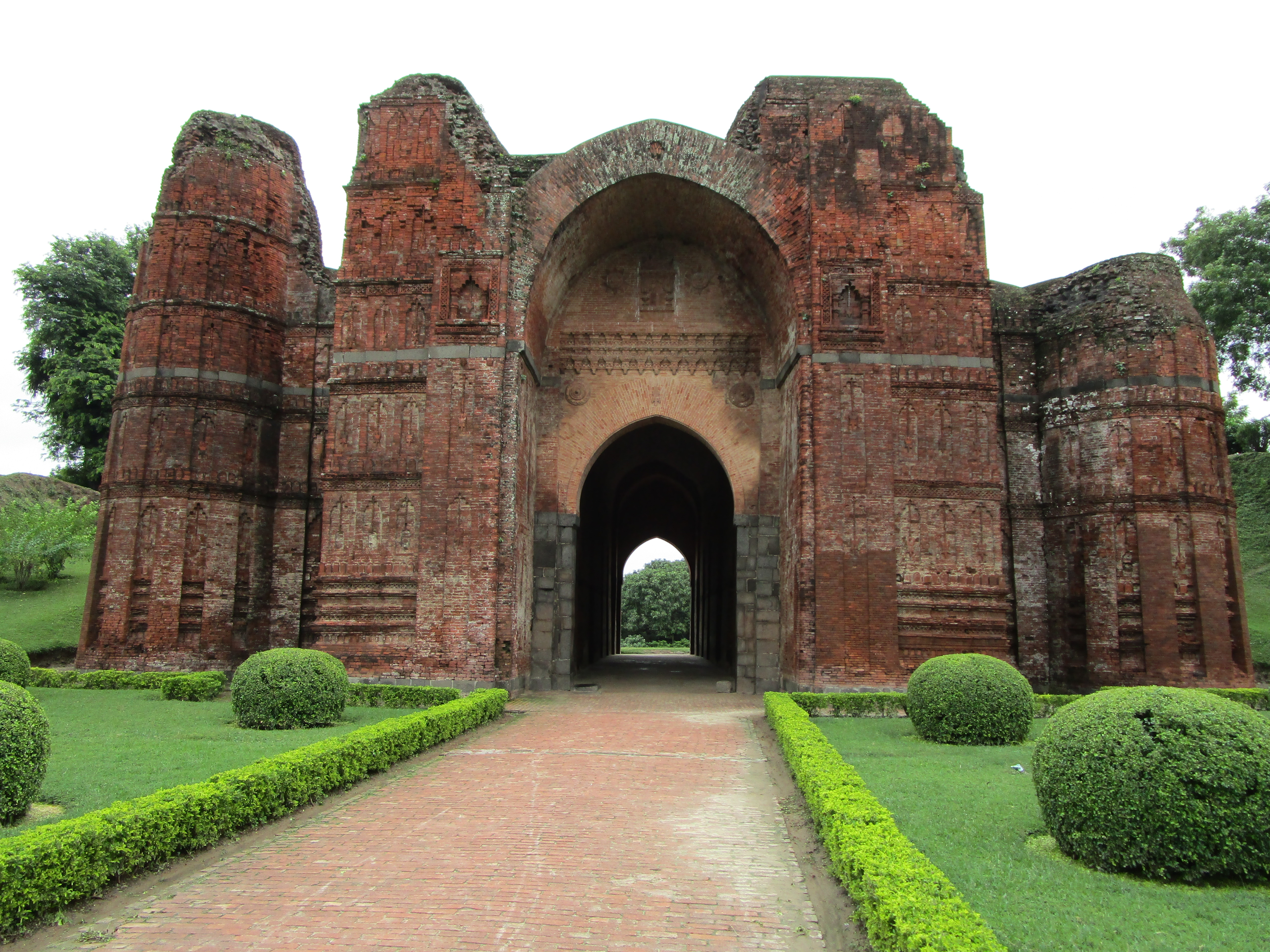
- Façade of the gate

- Location within West Bengal

General information
- Type: Gate
- Location: Gauda, Malda, West Bengal, India
- Coordinates: 24°52′49″N 88°07′30″E
- Completed: 1425; 601 years ago
- Governing body: Archaeology of India

Height
- Height: 14.95 m (49.0 ft)

Technical details
- Material: Brick, Stone
- Size: 2,306.25 m^{2} (24,824.3 sq ft)

Monument of National Importance
- Official name: Dakhil Darwaza
- Reference no.: N-WB-87

Dakhil Darwaza, (Bengali: দাখিল দরওয়াজা, lit. 'Main gate') also known as Salami Darwaza, is a grand 15th-16th century gateway located in Gaur, Malda district, West Bengal, India. It served as the main northern entrance to the citadel of Lakhnauti, the capital of the Bengal Sultanate. Constructed primarily with red bricks and terracotta, often attributed to the Hussain Shahi dynasty (c. 1494-1538), it exemplifies the Bengal style of architecture, blending Islamic and regional elements. The gateway, also called Salami Darwaza due to cannons fired from it as a salute, remains a significant historical monument protected by the Archeological Survey of India.

== History ==
Scholarly opinions on the Dakhil Darwaza's date and patron differ. It is assumed that the gate was built by Sultan Nasiruddin Mahmud Shah (r. 1435–1459) in 1425 AD. Some attribute its construction to the early 15th century under the restored Ilyas Shahi dynasty. Others link it to a 1519 inscription crediting Nusrat Shah (r. 1519–1533) of the Husain Shahi dynasty, suggesting it was built as a ceremonial gateway connecting the Gaur citadel to the Baro Sona Mosque (1526), about one kilometer northeast.

== Architecture ==
The gate is primarily constructed of brick, with stone facing on the piers between the doorways up to the arch springs. The structure measures 102.5 m (336 ft) in length and 22.5 m (74 ft) in width, (Note: According to Michell the width of the gate is 35m, while Malda government website indicates 34.5.) featuring a central passage 4.5 m (15 ft) wide. Flanking the corridor are two guardrooms on each side, each measuring 22.7 by 2.9 m (74.5 by 9.5 ft). According to measurements by Alexander Cunningham, the gateway reaches a height of approximately 14.95 m (49.0 ft), with the main entrance arch rising to 10.35 m (34.0 ft). Other measurements indicates the exterior 18.5 m (61 ft) high. A smaller archway behind the wider arch leads to the vaulted passage. The architecture of Dakhil Darwaza resembles Baro Sona Mosque, Choto Sona Mosque and Adina Mosque.

== Gallery ==
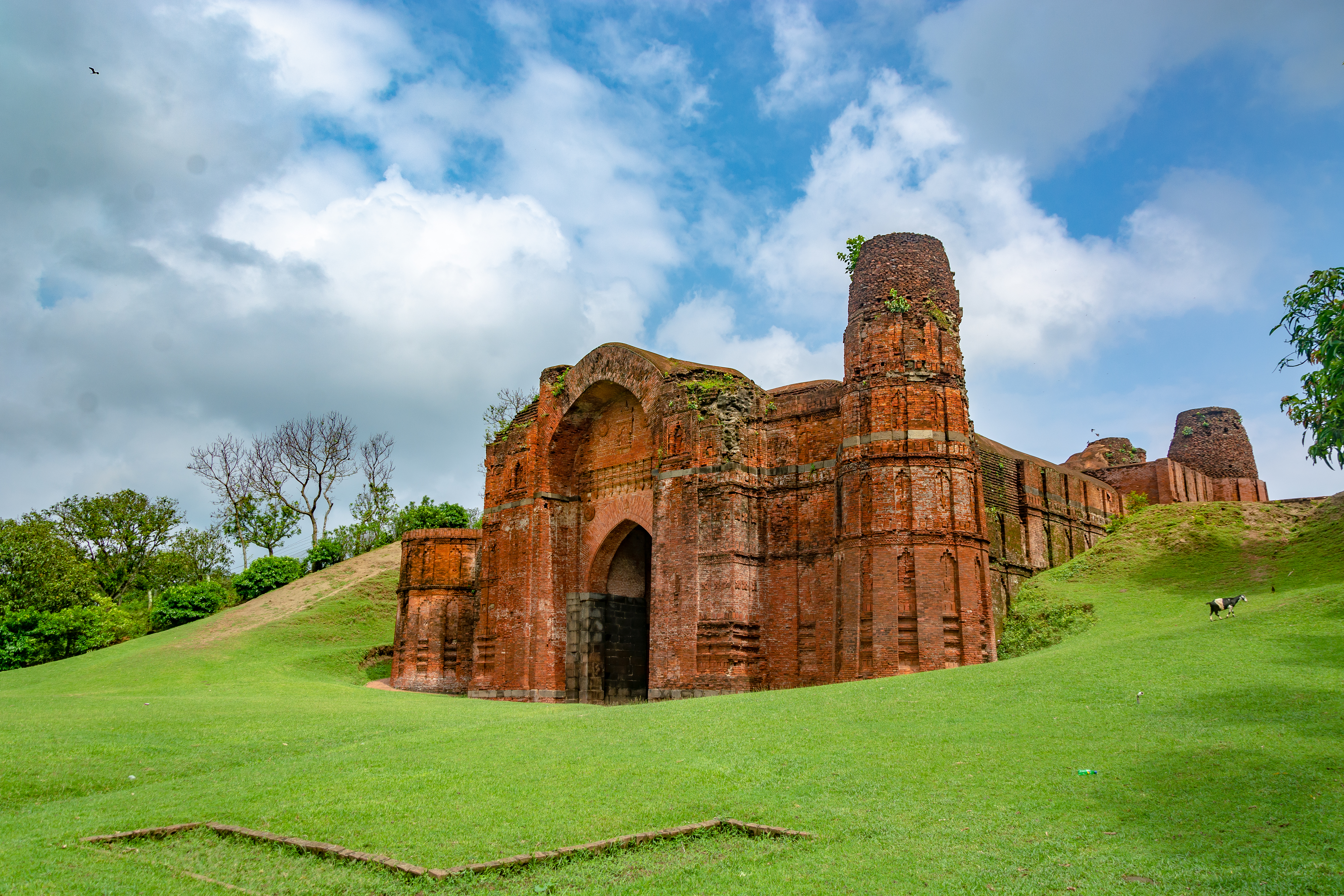
Side view of the gateway

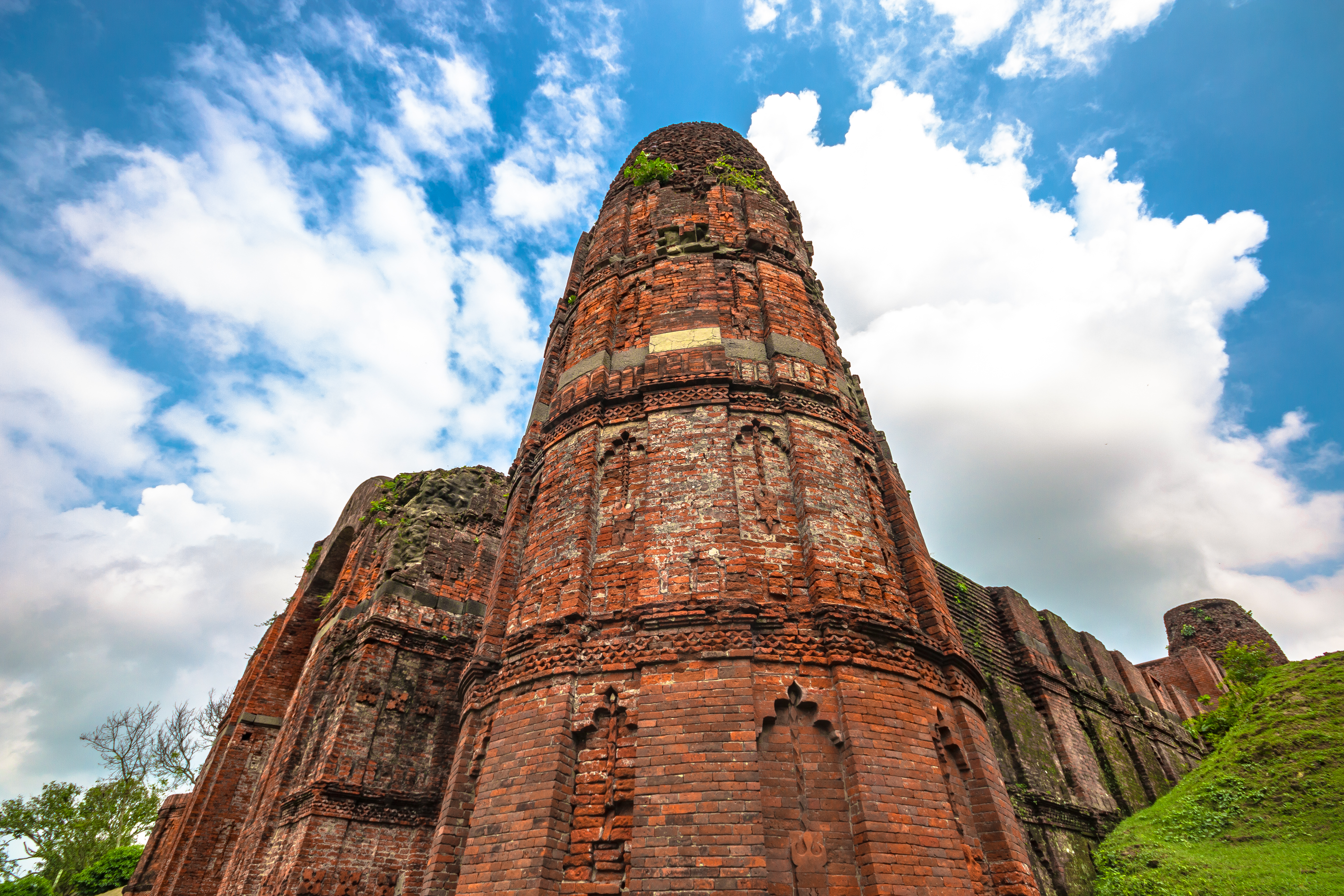
Corner turret

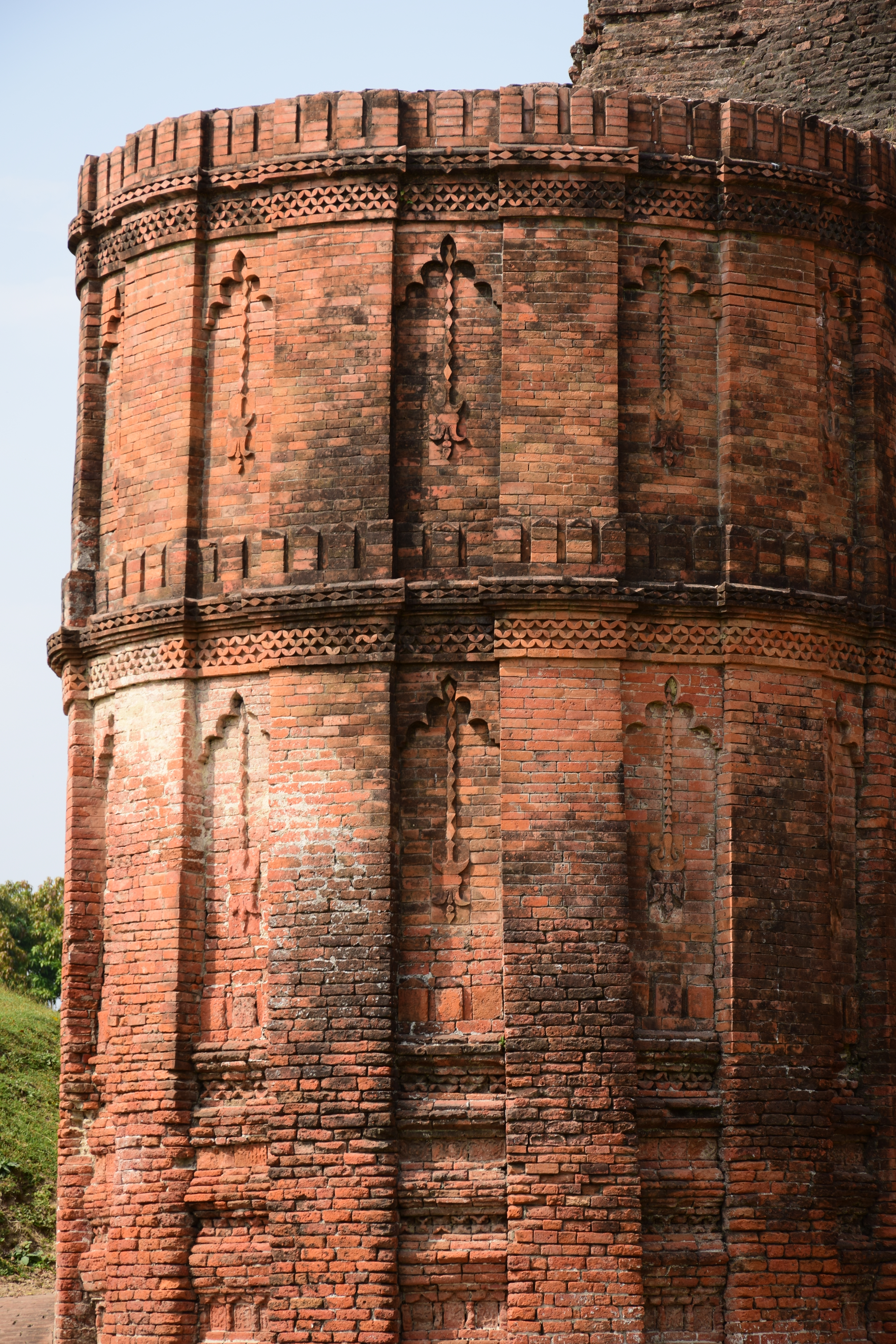
High point of the ruined corner turrets

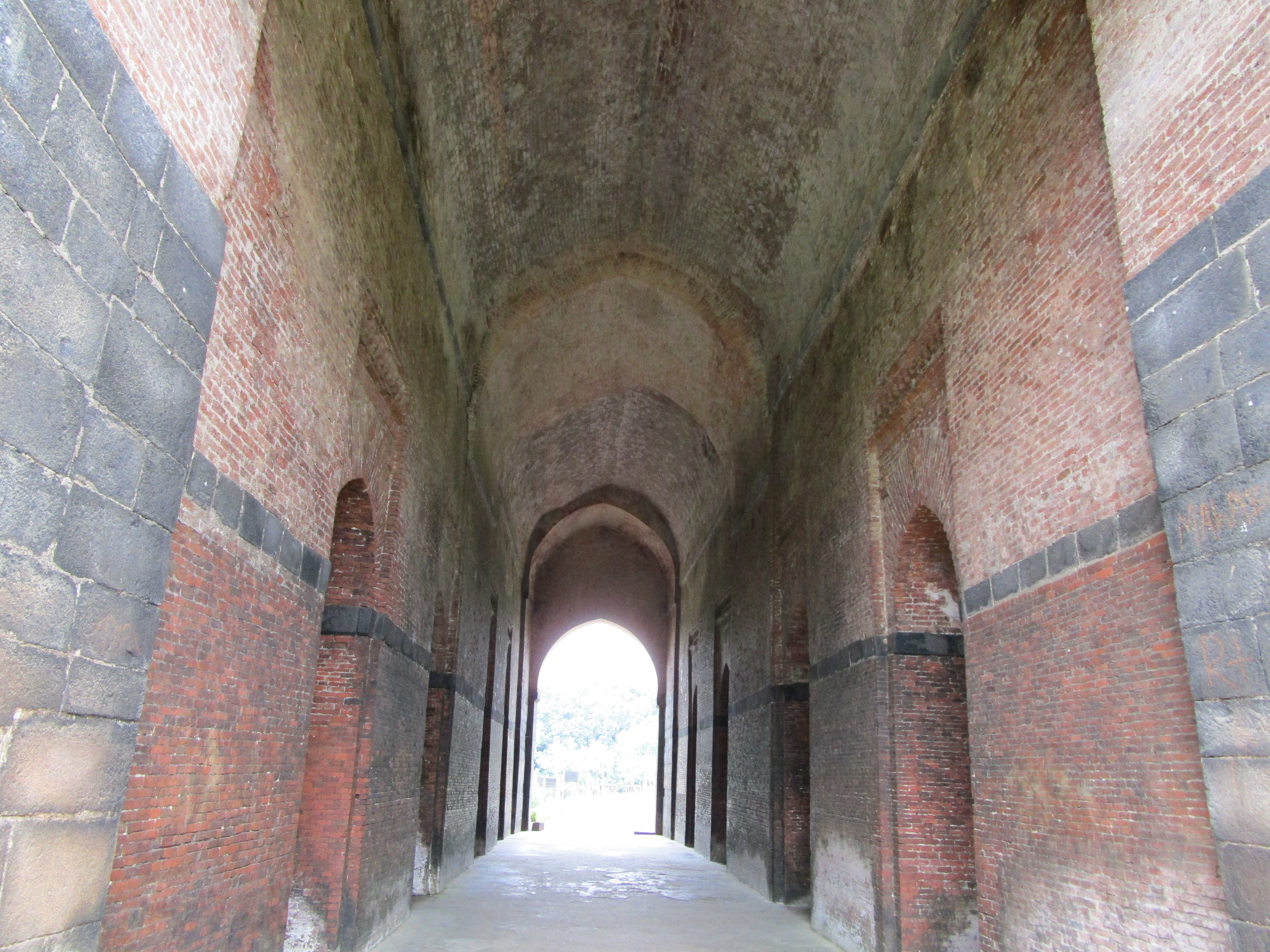
Inside of the gateway

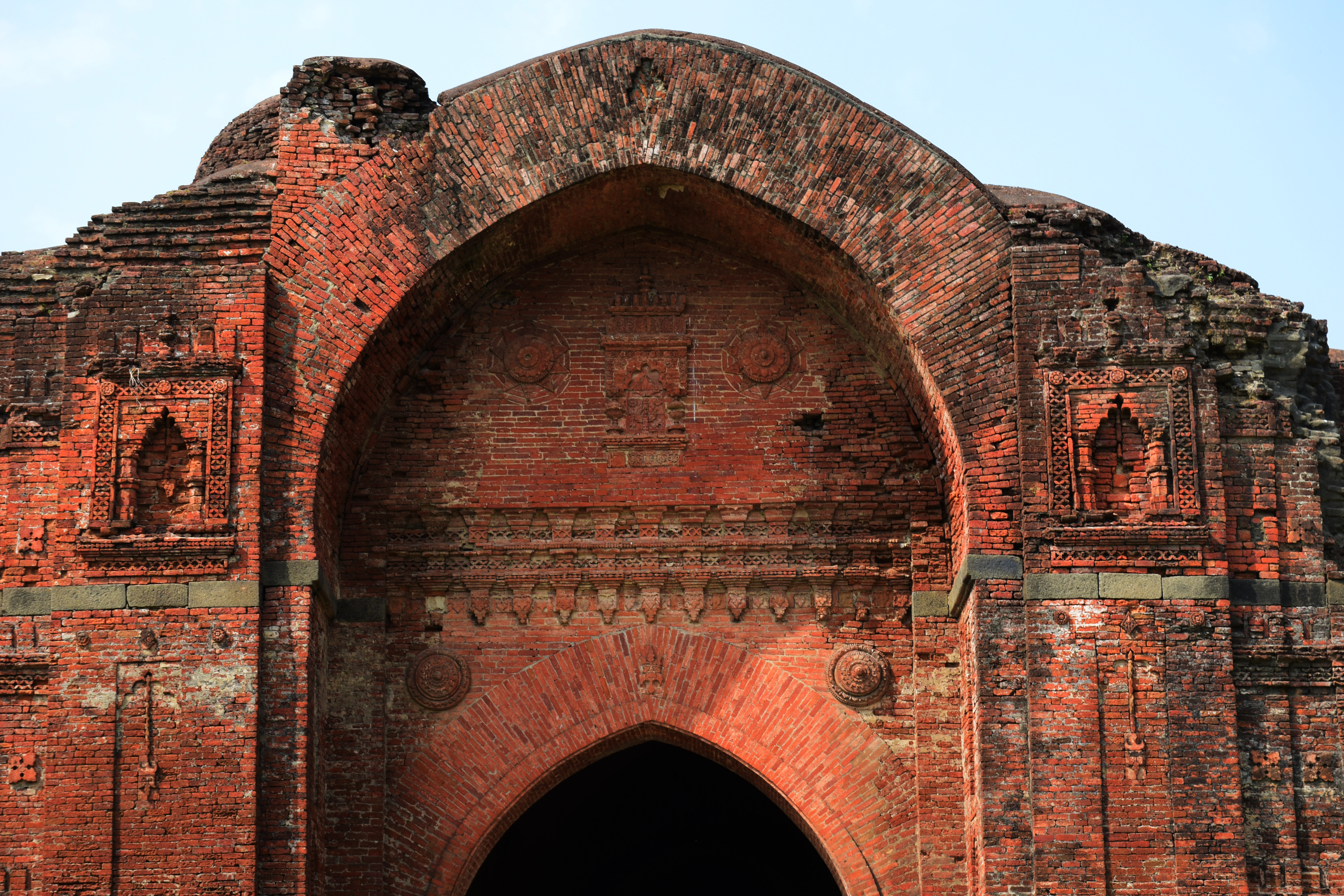
Entrance arch

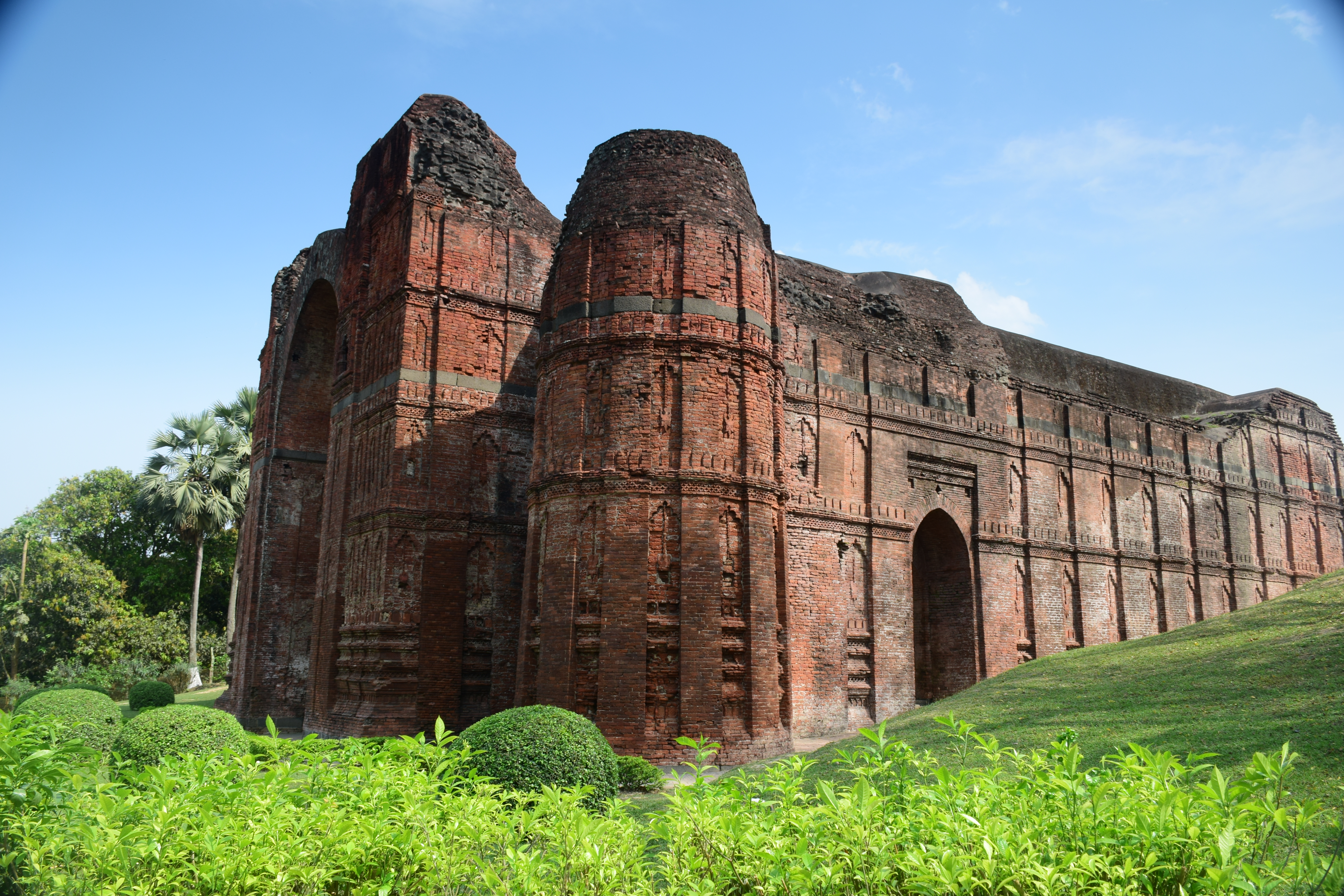
Side view of the gate

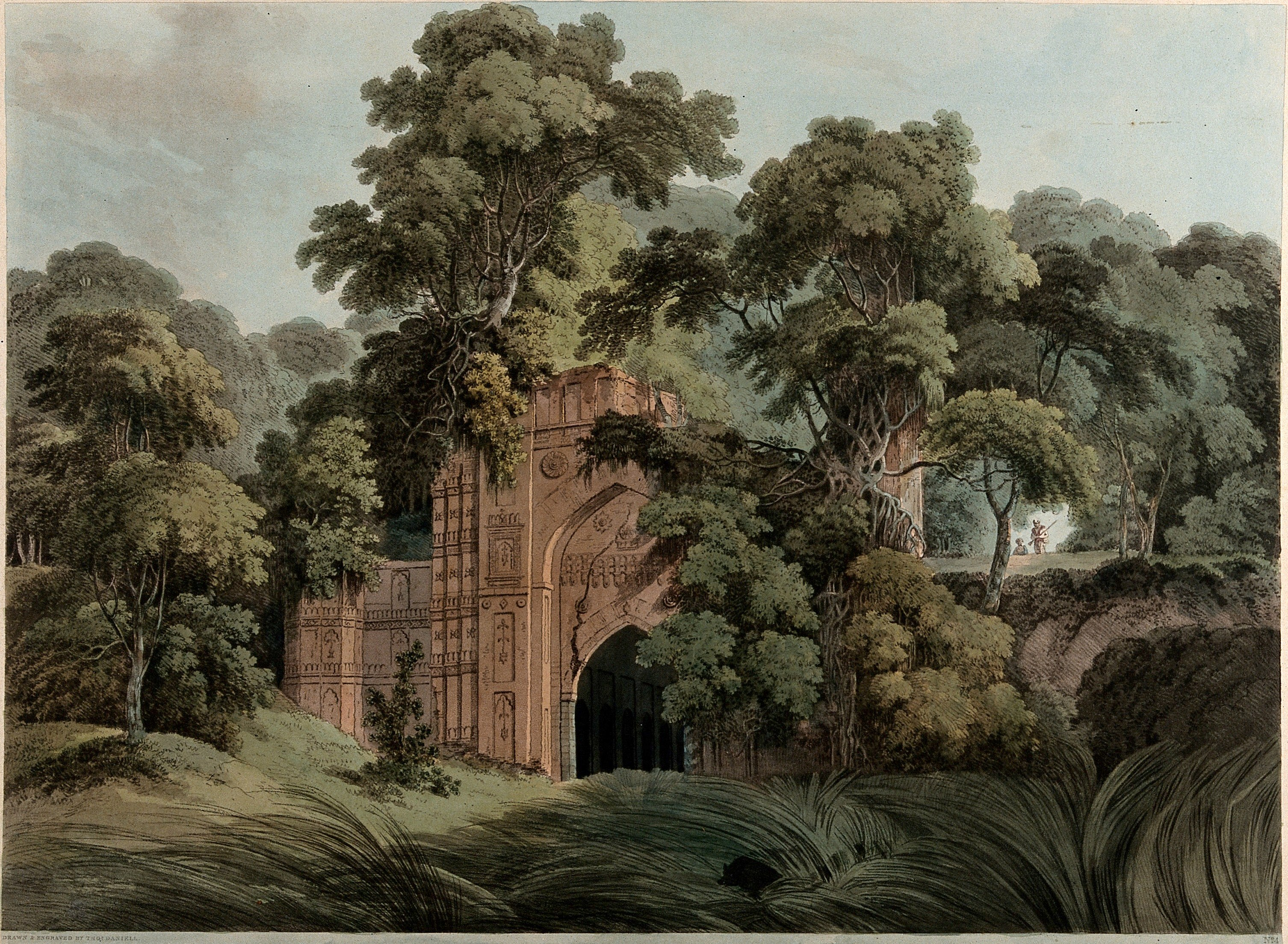
The doorway painted in 1795 AD

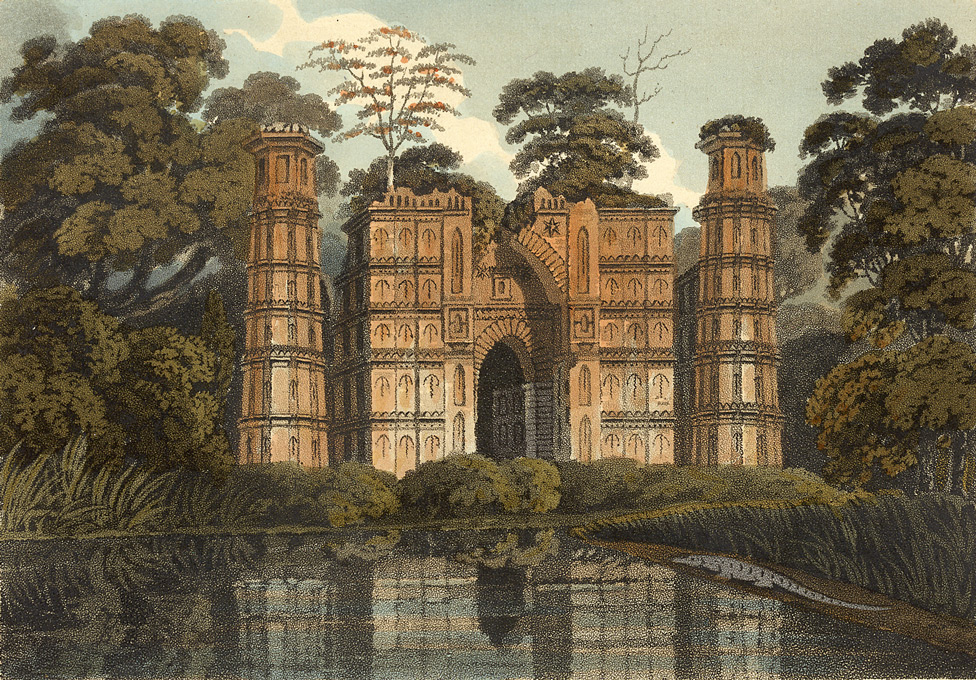
Dakhil Darwaza painted by Henry Gordon Creighton in 1817 AD

== See also ==
- Gumti Darwaza
- Kotwali Gate

== Bibliography ==
- Michell, George, ed. (1984). The Islamic Heritage of Bengal. Unesco. ISBN 978-92-3-102174-9.
