= Gumti Darwaza =

Monument in Gaur, West Bengal

- গুমটি দরওয়াজা
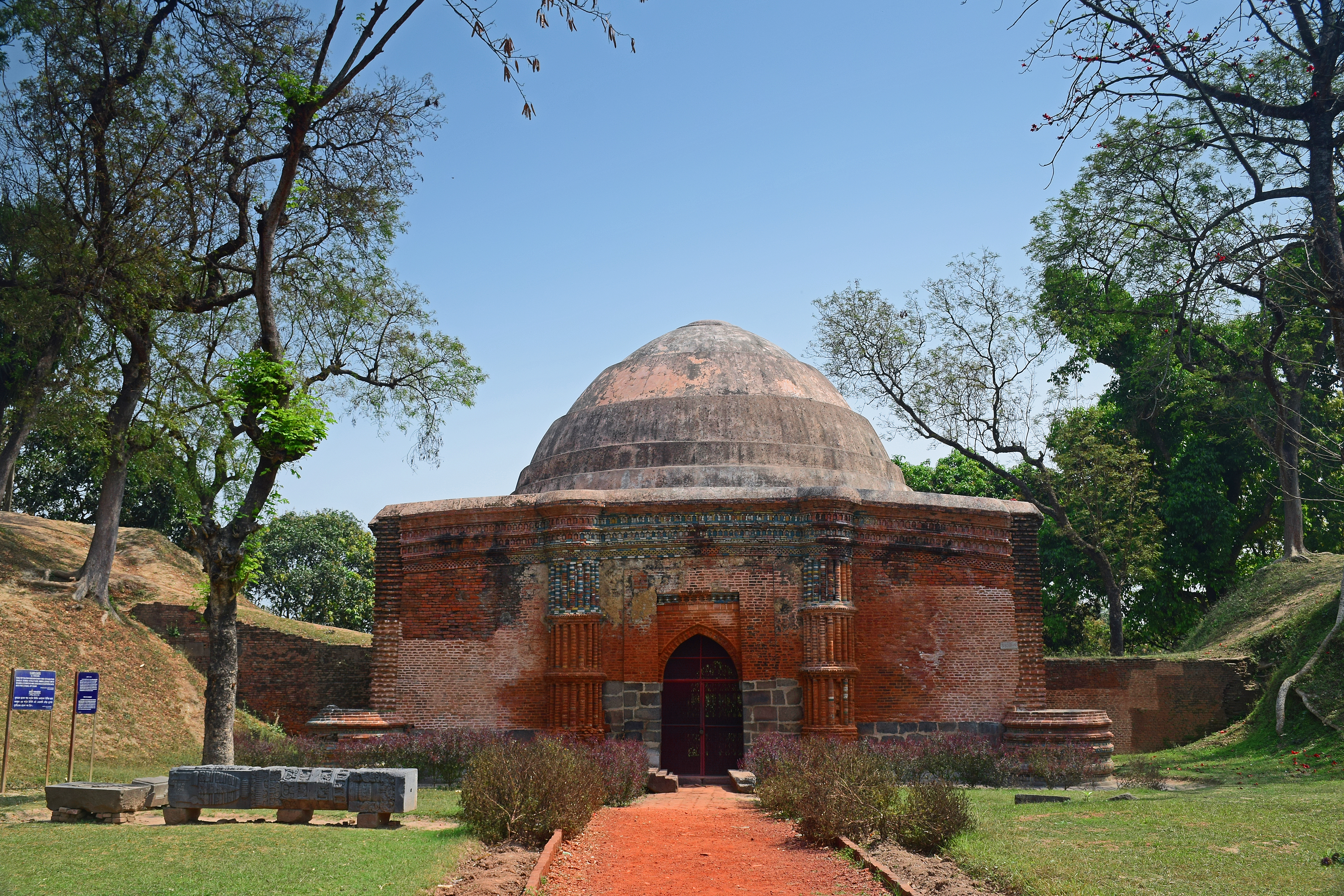
- Façade of the gate

- Location within West Bengal

General information
- Type: Gate
- Location: Kadam Rasul Rd, Gauda, Malda, West Bengal, India
- Coordinates: 24°52′05″N 88°07′56″E
- Completed: 1512; 514 years ago
- Governing body: Archaeology of India

Technical details
- Material: Brick
- Size: 12.80 m^{2} (137.8 sq ft)

The Gumti Darwaza (Note: Also spelled Gumpti Darwaza) or Gumti Gate (Bengali: গুমটি দরওয়াজা) is a historical monument located in the city of Gour, Malda, West Bengal, India, serving as the eastern gateway to the citadel of Gaur-Lakhnauti, the capital of the Bengal Sultanate. Assumed to be built in 1512 by Alauddin Hussain Shah, it is a fine example of Sultanate architecture, distinct from Mughal structures like the nearby Lukochuri Darwaza. The gate is now a protected monument under Archaeology Survey of India.

== History ==
Its construction is dated to the late 15th or early 16th century, with uncertainty about its exact builder. Some scholars attribute it to Sultan Nasiruddin Mahmud Shah, linking it to the citadel's construction. Others describe the erection of the gate in 1512 AD during Sultan Alauddin Husain Shah’s reign, based on an inscription found in the Shah Nimatullah tomb complex in Chapainawabganj, though this inscription lacks a patron’s name and does not clearly connect to the monument’s facade. Aligned with the Chika Building, the Gumti Darwaza likely served as an entrance to an administrative unit within the Gaur-Lakhnauti citadel.

== Architecture ==
The structure is a brick-built single room, measuring 7.60 sq.m internally with 2.65 m (8.7 ft) thick walls and an outer dimension of 12.80 sq.m. It has a square plan with four doorways, one on each side, and the east and west entrances are flanked by fluted turrets. Decorated multicoloured tiles resembles Lattan Mosque. The building is topped by a single dome supported by squinches, a feature tracing back to the Eklakhi Mausoleum at Pandua. The corners feature typical Sultanate-style corner towers. The Gumti Gate might have been an imitation of the Alai Darwaza in Delhi.

== Gallery ==
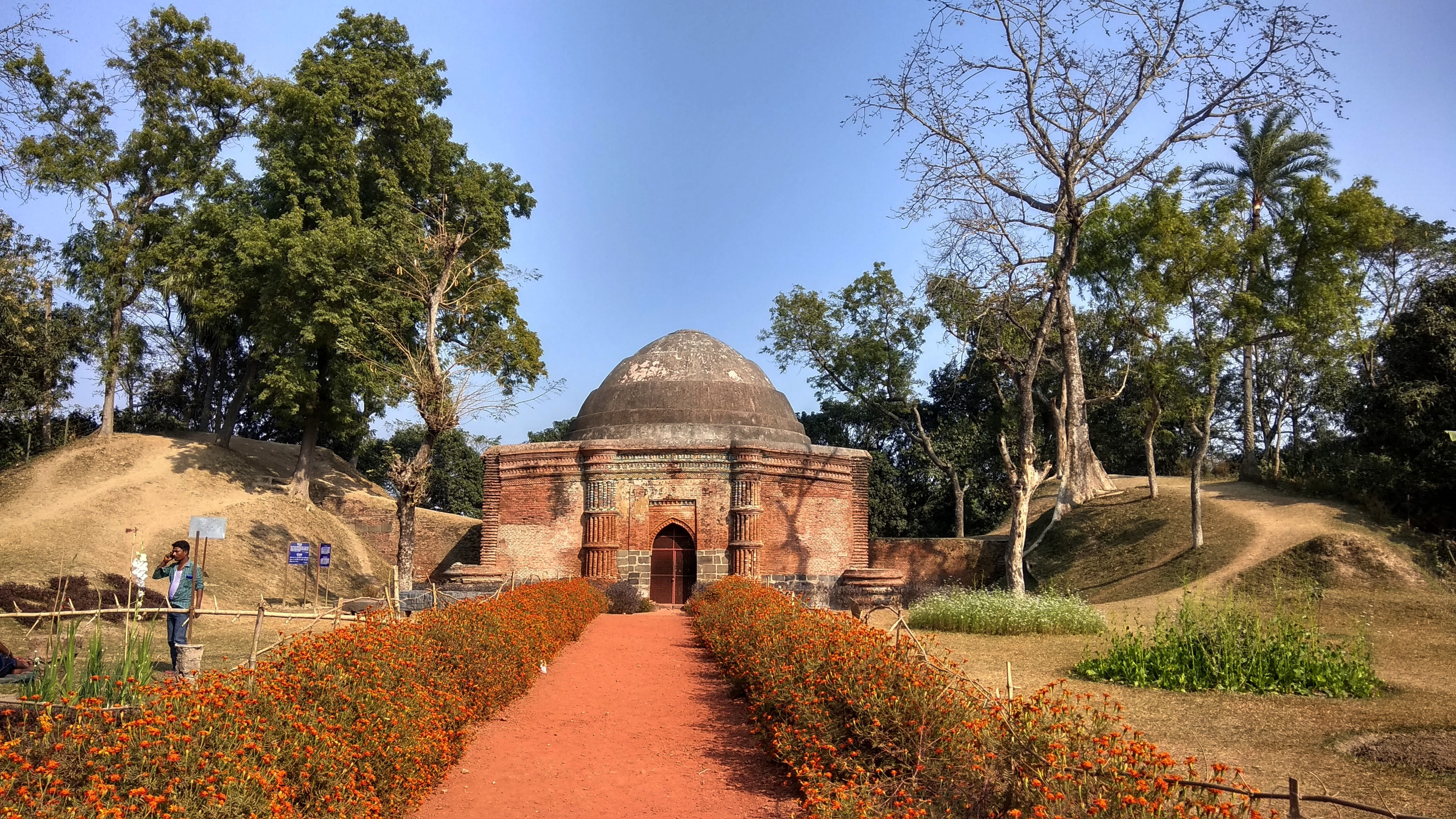
The gateway in 2019

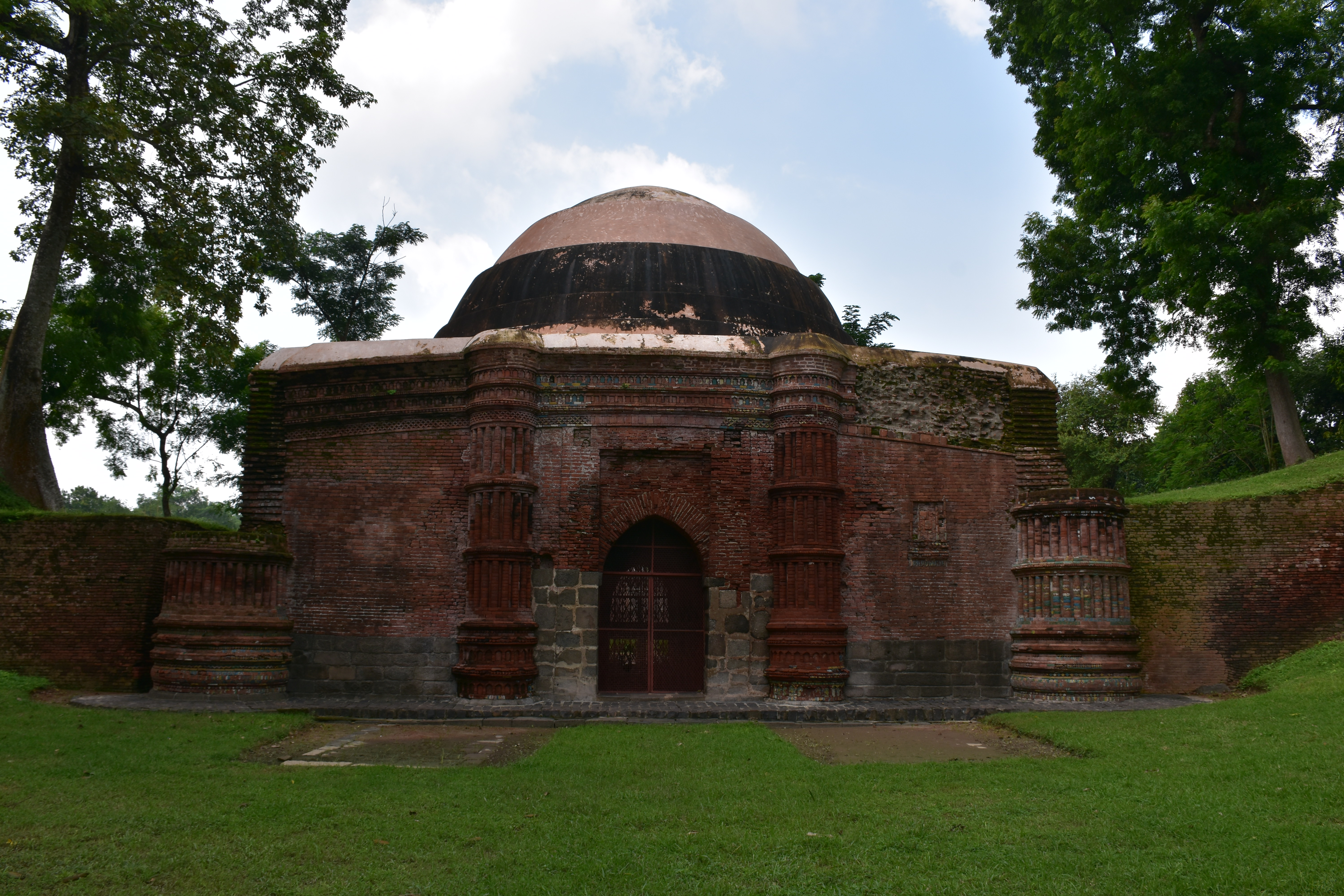
Front view of the gate

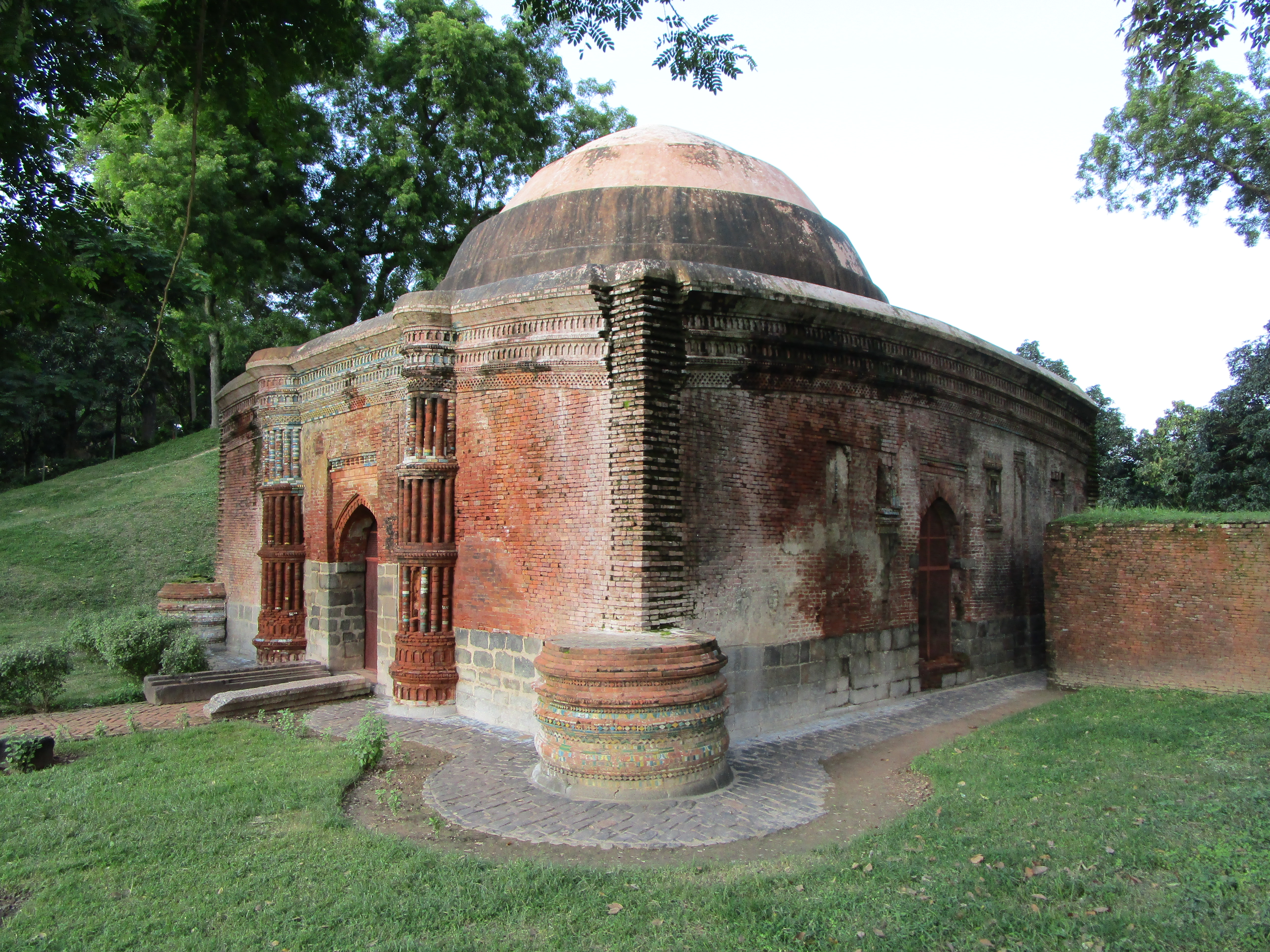
Cornered view

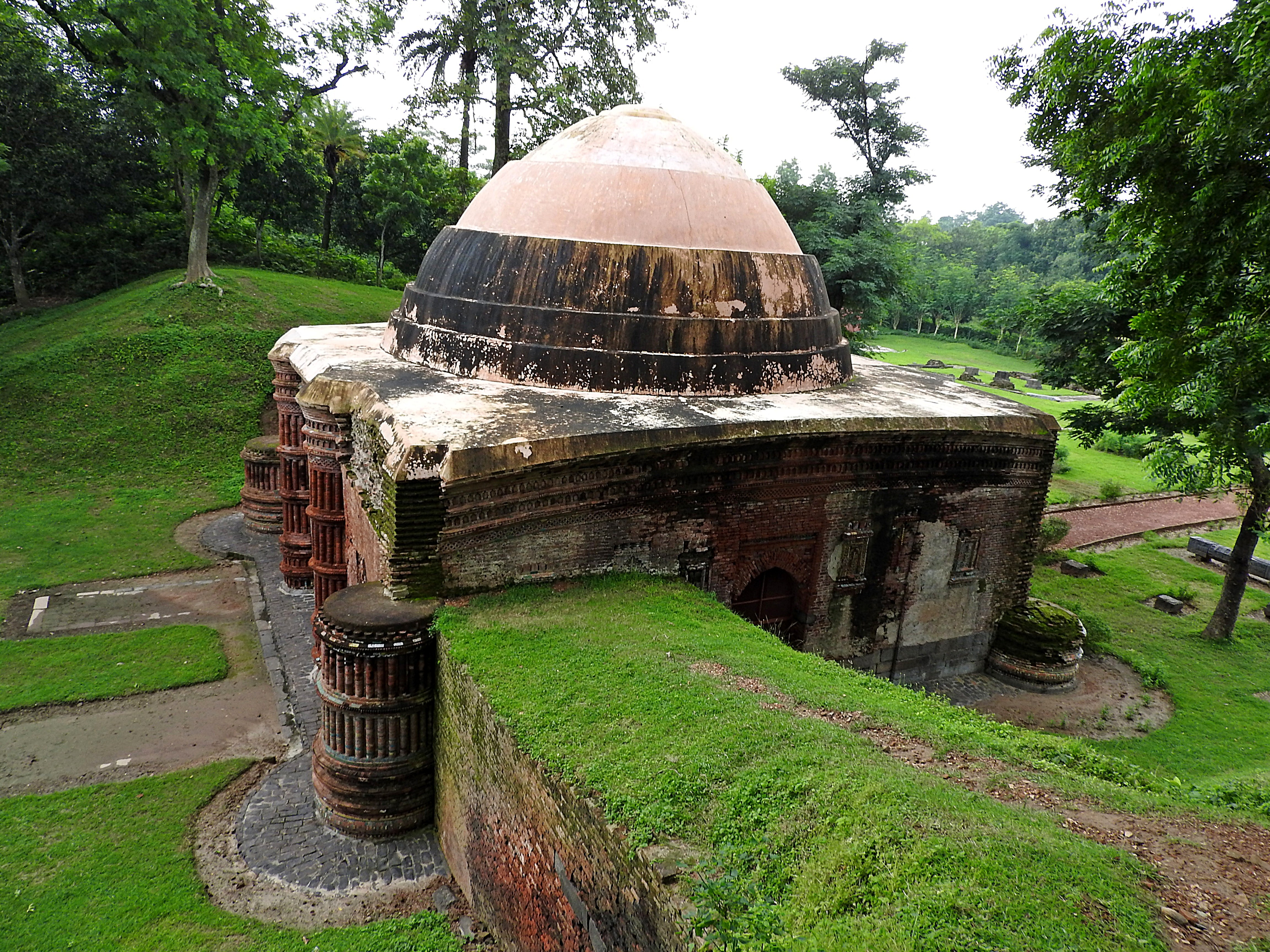
The gateway featuring semicircular dome

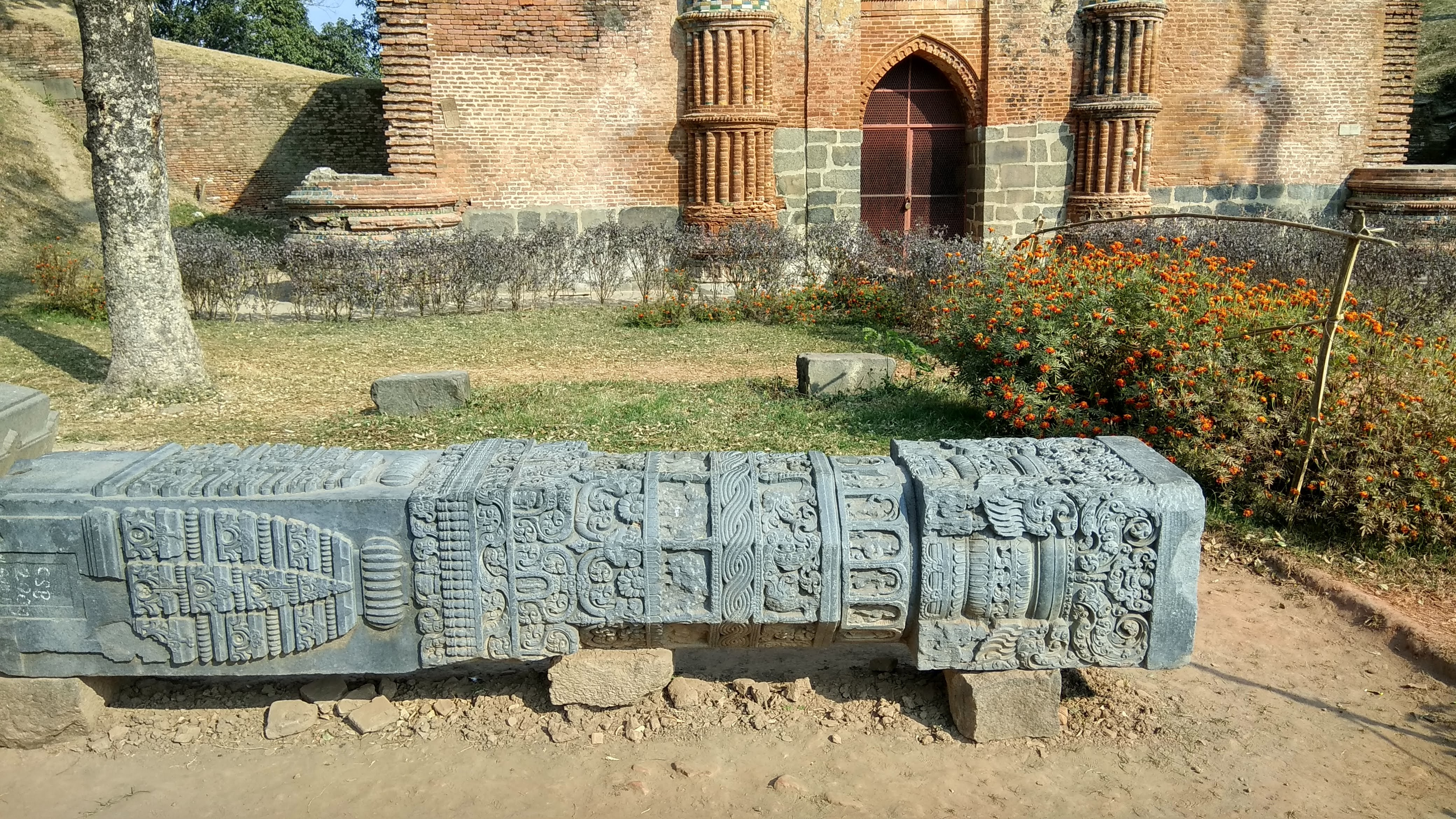
Pillar of unknown structure

== See also ==
- Firoz Minar
- Kotwali Gate
- Dakhil Darwaza

== Bibliography ==
- Michell, George, ed. (1984). The Islamic Heritage of Bengal. UNESCO. ISBN 978-92-3-102174-9.
