= Qadam Rasul Mosque =

Archeological site in West Bengal

- কদম রসুল মসজিদ
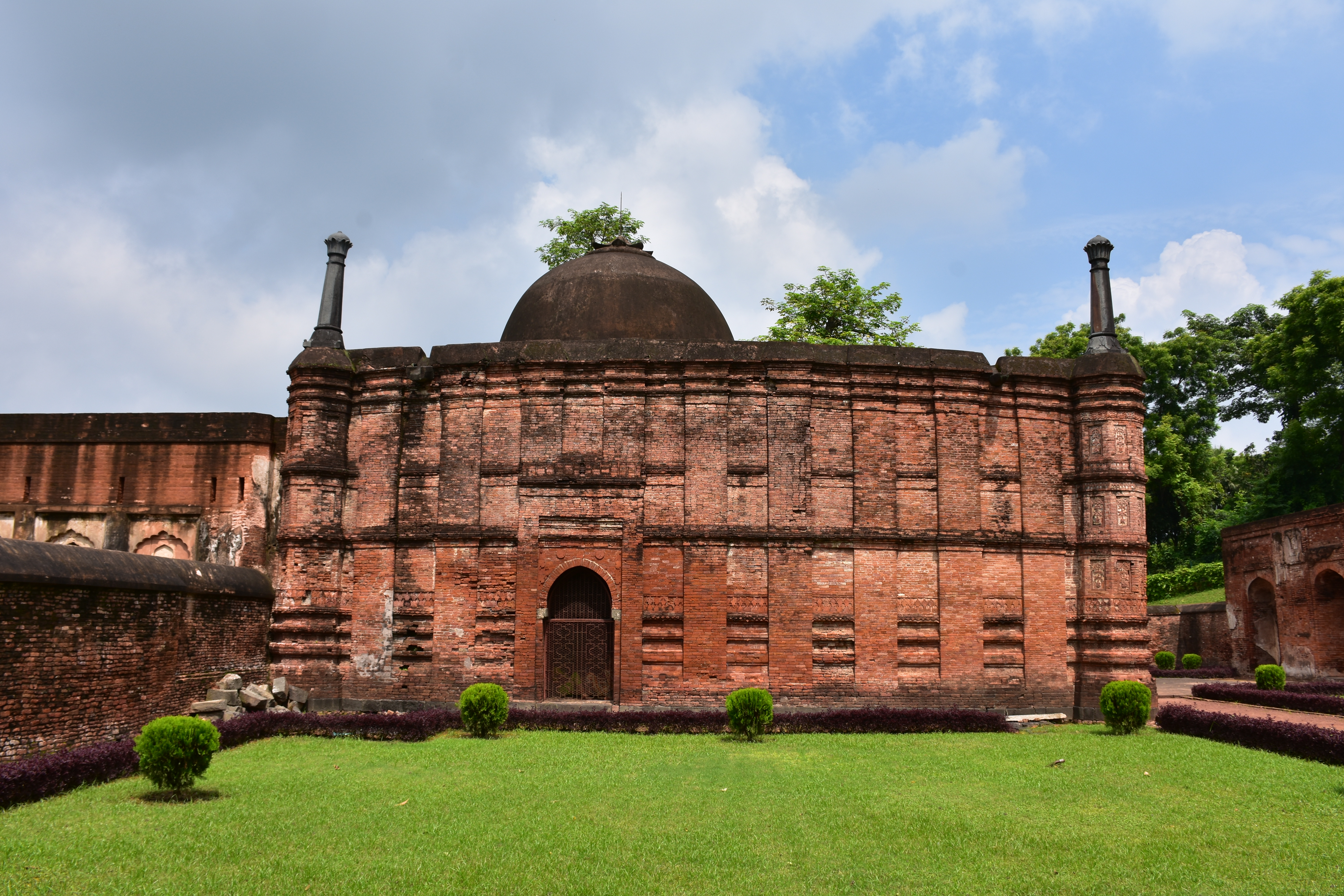

- Location of the monument in West Bengal

Religion
- Affiliation: Islam (former)
- Ecclesiastical or organizational status: Mosque (former)
- Status: Inactive (as a mosque)

Location
- Location: Gaur, Malda, West Bengal
- Country: India
- Interactive map of Qadam Rasul Mosque
- Administration: Archaeological Survey of India
- Coordinates: 24°52′10″N 88°07′54″E

Architecture
- Type: Mosque architecture
- Style: Indo-Islamic
- Founder: Nasiruddin Nasrat Shah
- Completed: 1530/1531 AD

Specifications
- Dome: 1
- Materials: Brick, Stone

Monument of National Importance
- Official name: Qadam Rasul Mosque
- Reference no.: N-WB-94

The Qadam Rasul Mosque (Bengali: কদম রসুল মসজিদ) built in 1530-1531 by Sultan Nusrat Shah (r. 1519–1533) in the ancient city of Gaur, is a historic single-domed mosque known for housing a stone tablet bearing the footprint of Prophet Muhammad. The mosque, set amidst a lush garden, is a significant heritage and cultural site, maintained by the Archaeological Survey of India.

== History ==
According to local tradition, the footprint of prophet Muhammad came from the Khanqah of the 13th century saint Jalaluddin Tabrizi of Pandua. It was moved to Lakhnauti (Gaur) by Sultan Alauddin Husain Shah (r. 1494–1519). Husain Shah's successor Nasiruddin Mahmud Shah built the mosque to preserve the tablet in (937 AH) 1530/1531 AD.

== Architecture ==
=== Qadam Rasul Mosque ===
The Qadam Rasul Mosque is a rectangular brick structure with a highly embellished east façade featuring three arched entrances on octagonal piers and four rows of panels with cusped-arch and hanging-bell motifs, similar to the Bagha Mosque (930 AH 1523/1524) in Rajshahi also built under Nusrat Shah. It has vaulted verandahs on the north, east, and south sides, each opening to a central square room containing a relic. The north and south exterior walls have simple recessed panels. Likely the earliest structure in its compound, it predates the guesthouses, gateway, and other buildings, which are attributed to the Mughal period and linked to the Lukochuri Darwaza. The mosque compound also holds the tomb of Mughal general Fateh Khan.

=== Tomb of Fateh Khan ===
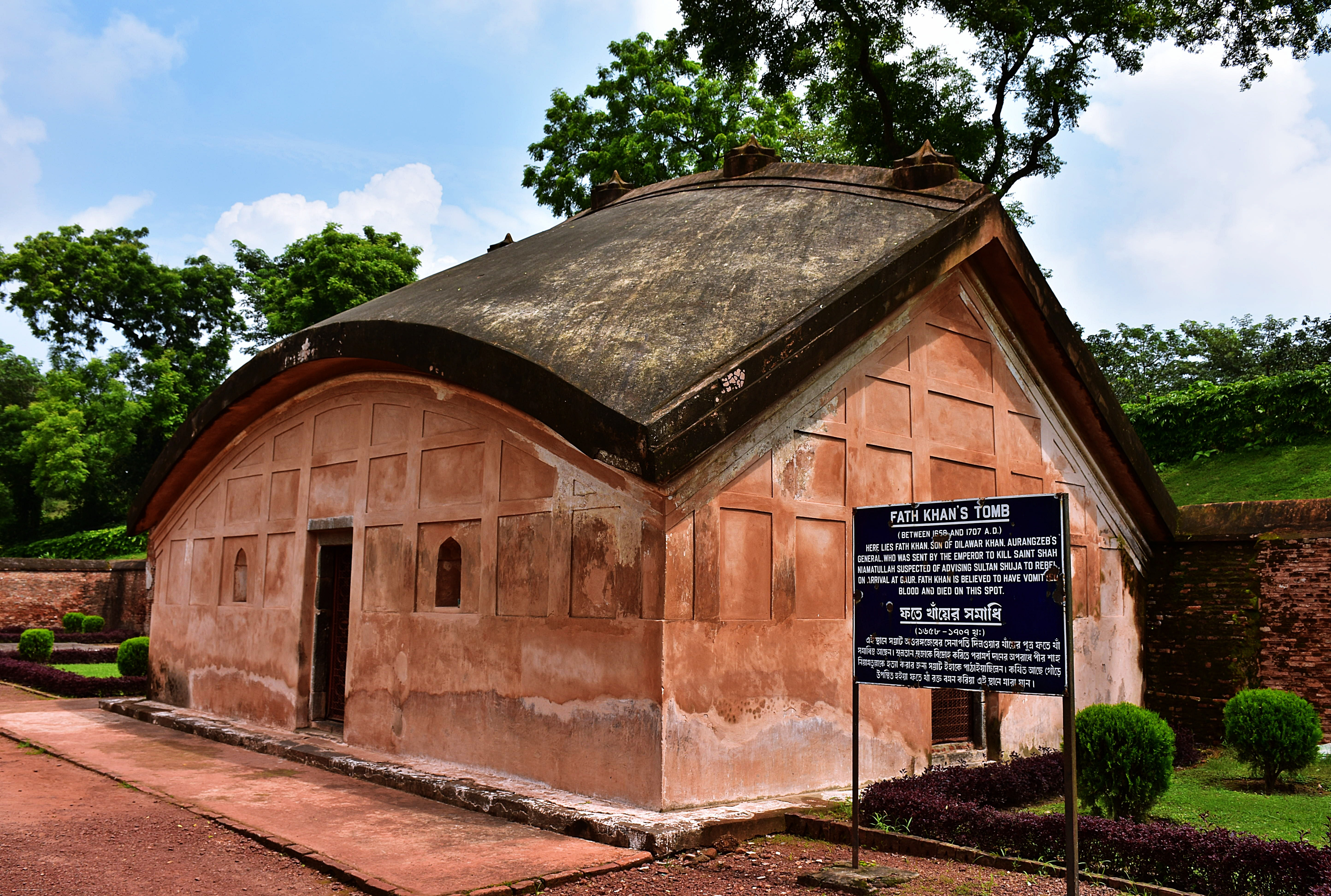
17th century Mughal general Fateh Khan's tomb

Beside the mosque, lies the tomb of Fateh Khan, son of Diler Khan and a general of Mughal emperor Aurangzeb (r. 1658–1707). The tomb measures externally 9.35 by 8.35 m (30.7 by 27.4 ft) and has three doorways on the west, north, and southern side. The tomb is constructed of stucco over brick, the tomb features a do-chala roof style.

== Gallery ==
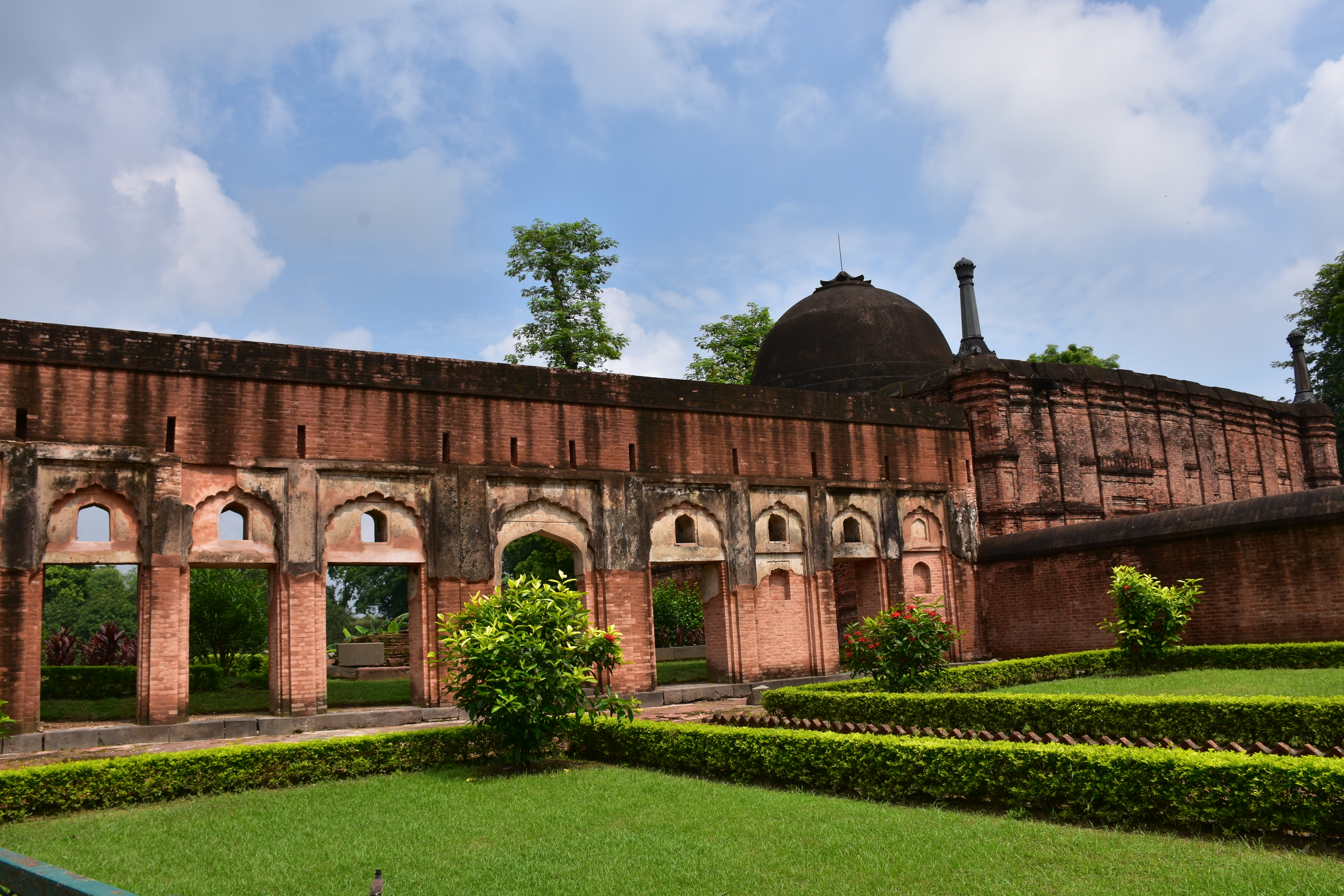
General view of the mosque complex

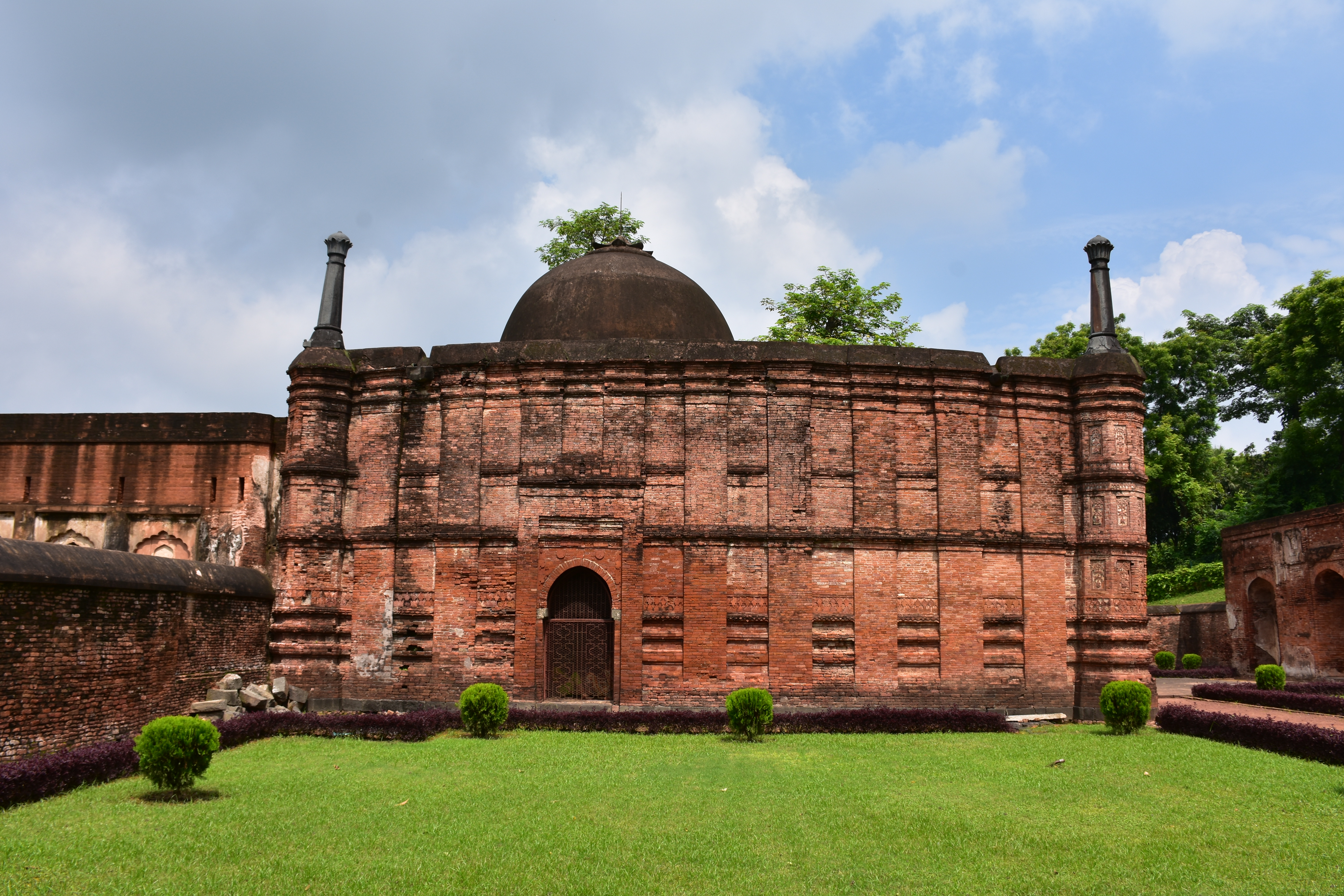
Side view

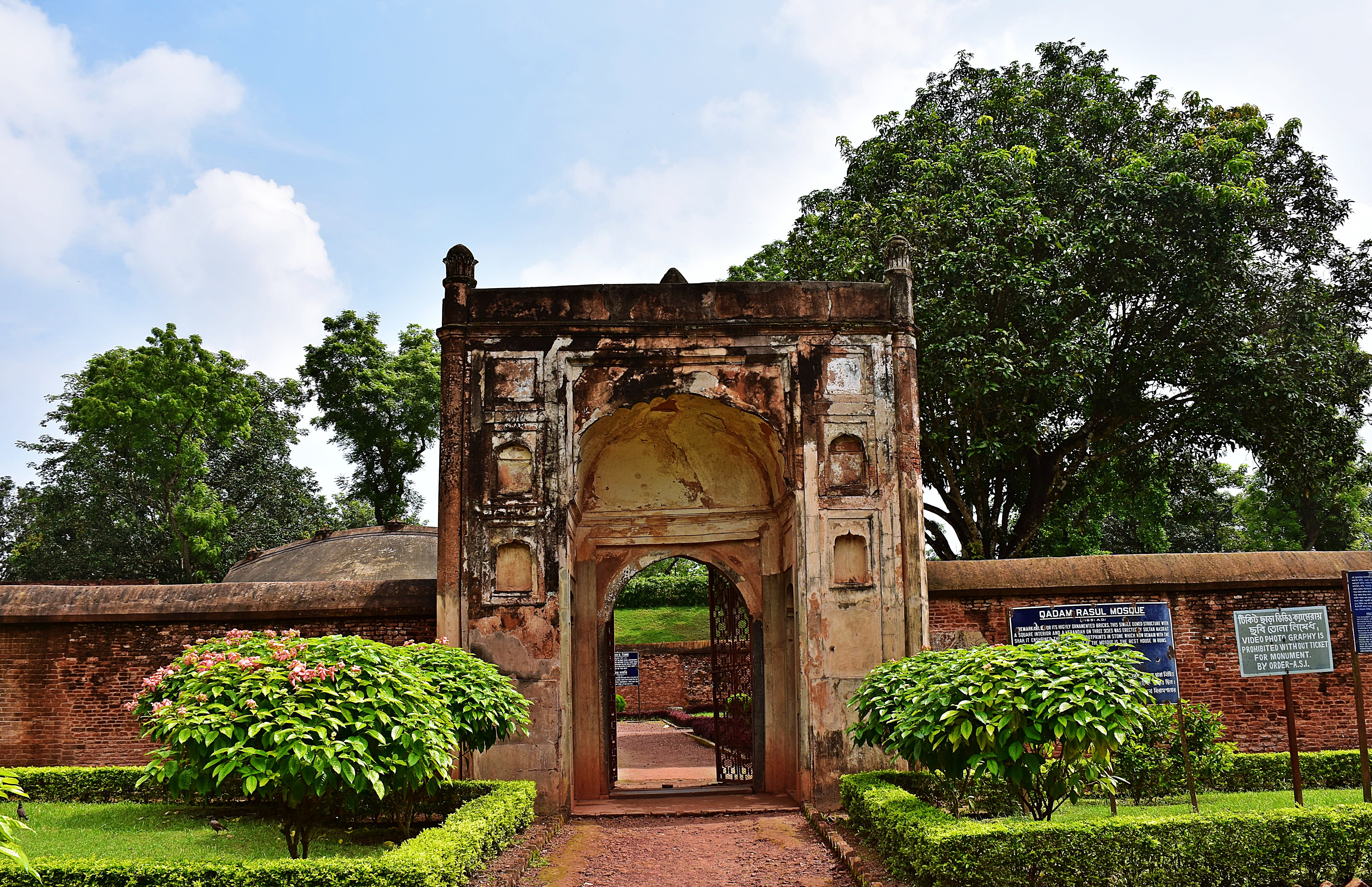
Main entrance

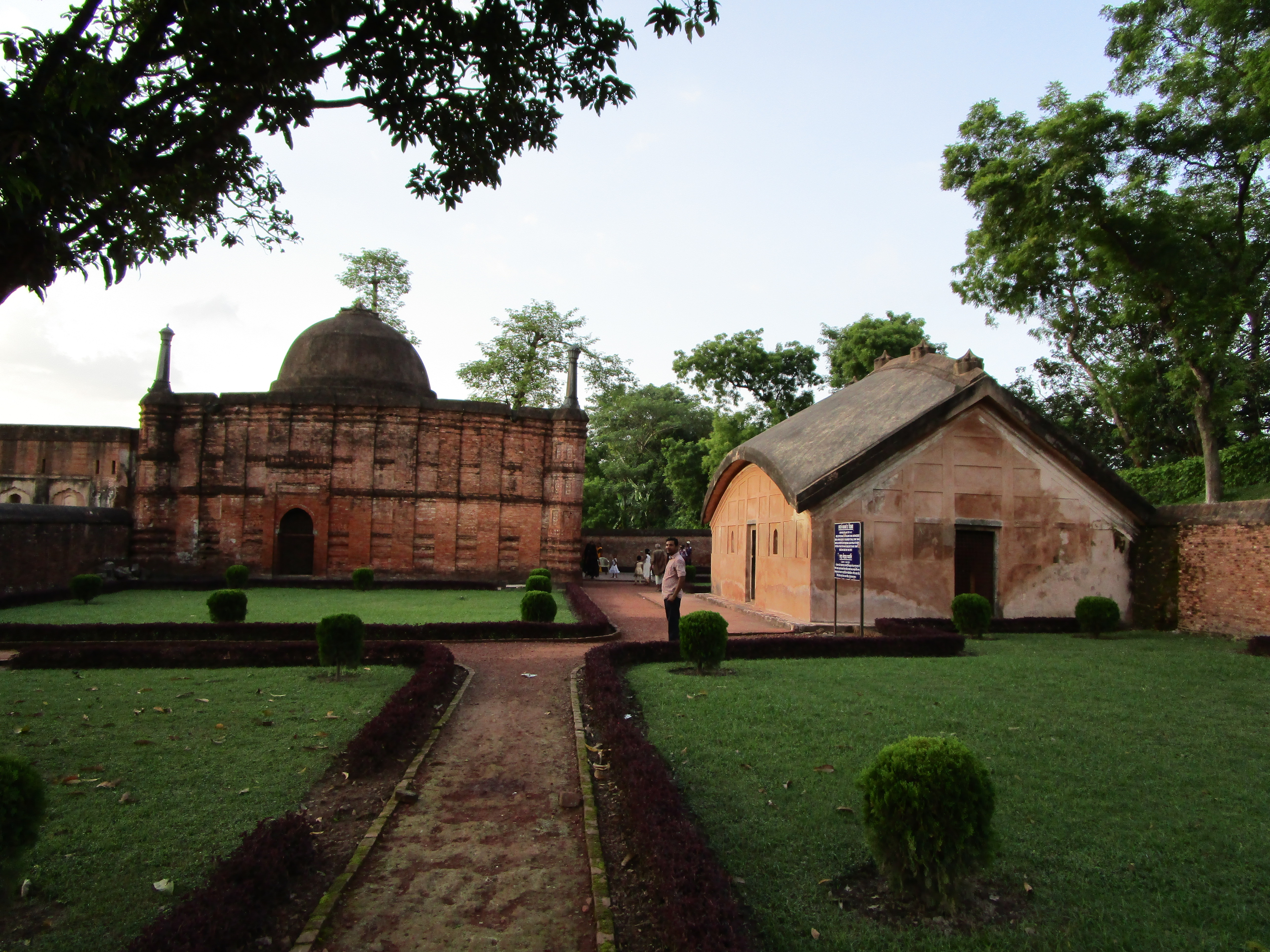
The mosque and the tomb of Fateh Khan

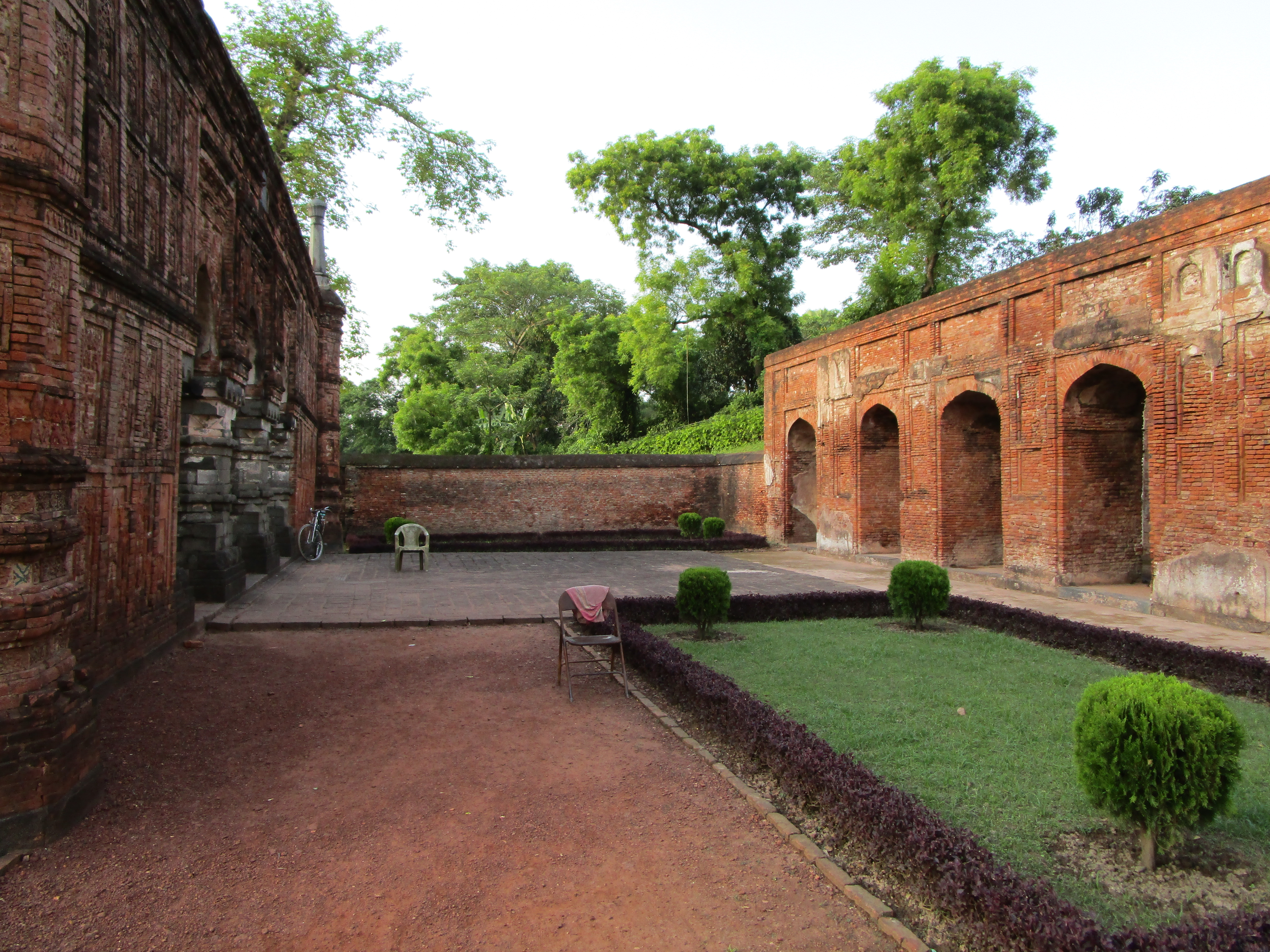
The wall of the compound

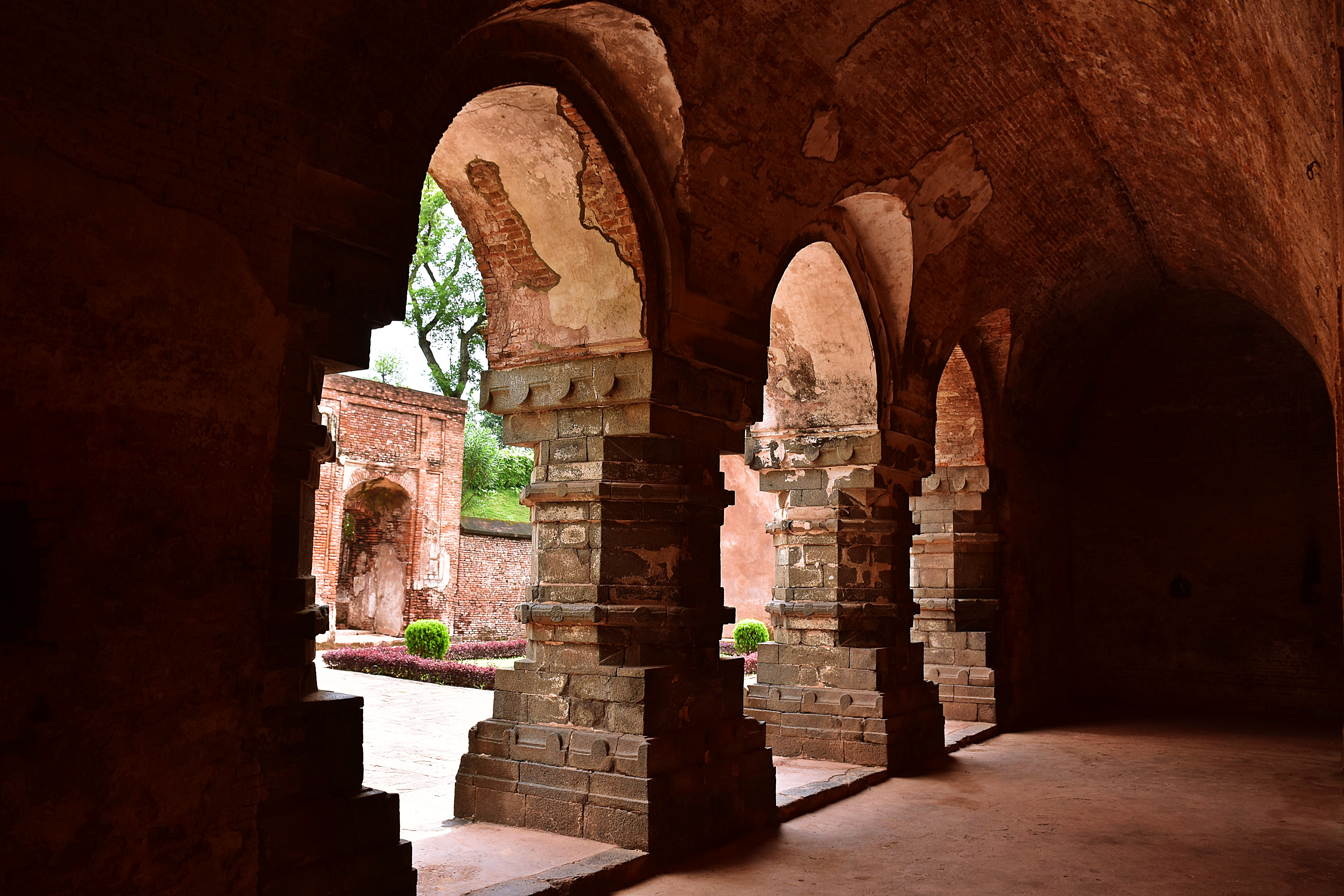
Stone pillars

== See also ==
- Zafar Khan Ghazi Mosque and Dargah
- Lattan Mosque

== Bibliography ==
- Michell, George (1984). The Islamic Heritage of Bengal. ISBN 978-92-3-102174-9.
