= Baro Shona Masjid =

Former mosque in West Bengal, India

- বড়ো সোনা মসজিদ
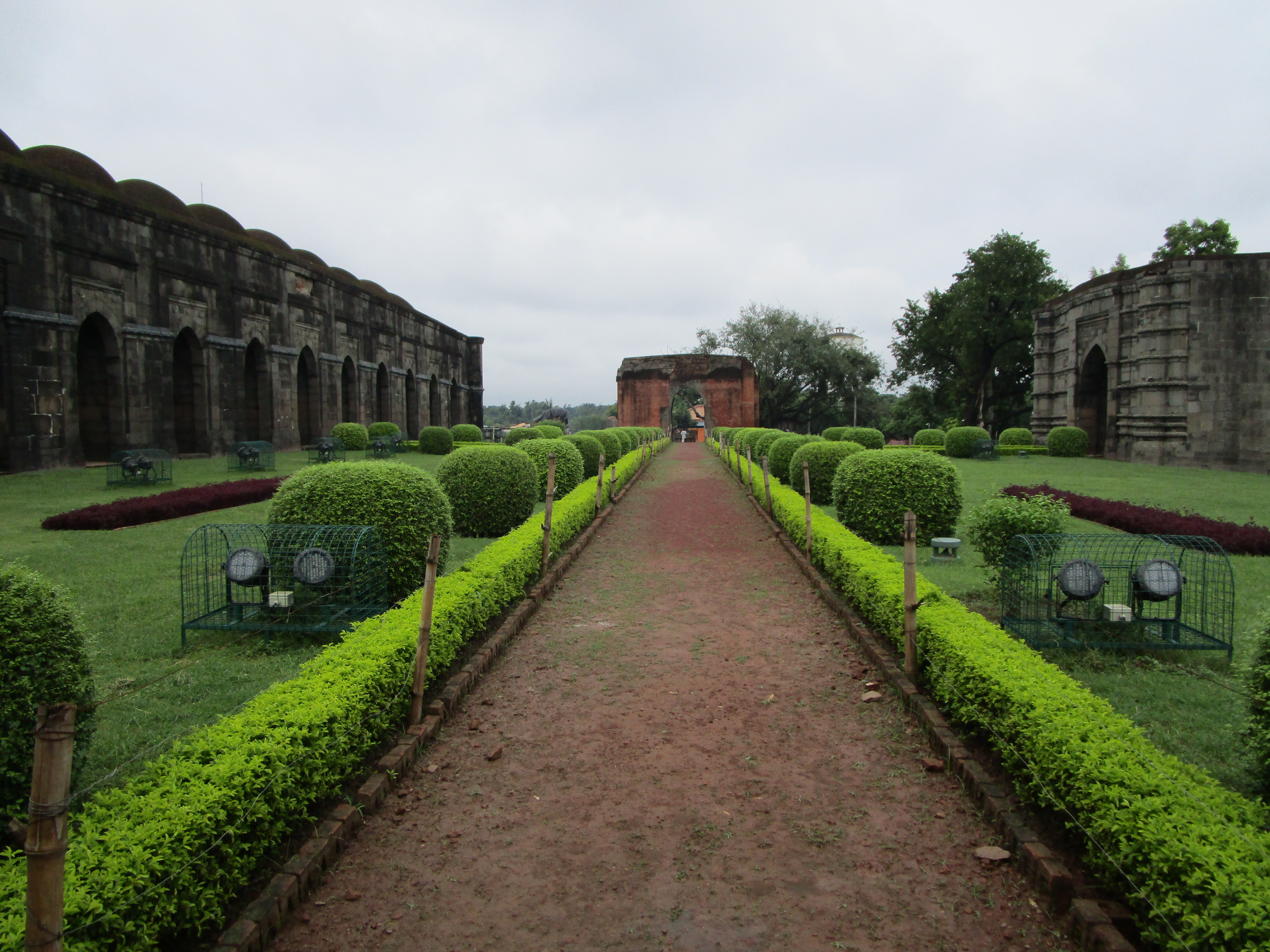
- The former mosque, in 2016

- Location of the former mosque in West Bengal

Religion
- Affiliation: Islam (former)
- Ecclesiastical or organisational status: Mosque (former)
- Status: Inactive (as a mosque); Partial ruinous state

Location
- Location: Ramkeli, Gour, Malda, West Bengal
- Country: India
- Administration: Archaeological Survey of India
- Coordinates: 24°52′58″N 88°07′41″E

Architecture
- Type: Mosque architecture
- Style: Indo-Islamic
- Completed: 1526 CE

Specifications
- Length: 51 m (168 ft)
- Width: 23 m (76 ft)
- Height (max): 12 m (39 ft)
- Dome: 44

Monument of National Importance
- Official name: Baraduary Masjid or the Great Golden Mosque
- Reference no.: N-WB-83

The Baro Shona Masjid (Bengali: বড়ো সোনা মসজিদ, romanized: Great Golden Mosque), also known as the Baroduari Masjid (Bengali: বারোদুয়ারী মসজিদ, romanized: 12-gated Mosque) and as the Qutub Shahi Mosque, is a former mosque in a partial ruinous state, located in Gour, in the Malda district, in the state of West Bengal, India.

Completed in 1526 CE, it is situated 500 metres (1,600 ft) south of Ramkeli, a village on the way to Gour, and 12 kilometres (7.5 mi) south of the town of Malda. The mosque with its ruins can be found very close to the India-Bangladeshi border. With a gigantic rectangular structure of brick and stone, this mosque is the largest monument in Gour. Even though one of the mosque's names "Baroduari Masjid" implies that it has 12 doors, only eleven survive in its ruinous state.

The former mosque is a Monument of National Importance, managed by the Archaeological Survey of India (ASI).

== History ==
The construction of the Baro Shona Masjid was started by Alauddin Husain Shah and was completed in 1526 by his son Nasiruddin Nasrat Shah. The Indo-Arabic architectural style and the ornamental stone carvings make the former mosque a special attraction for tourists.

== Architecture ==
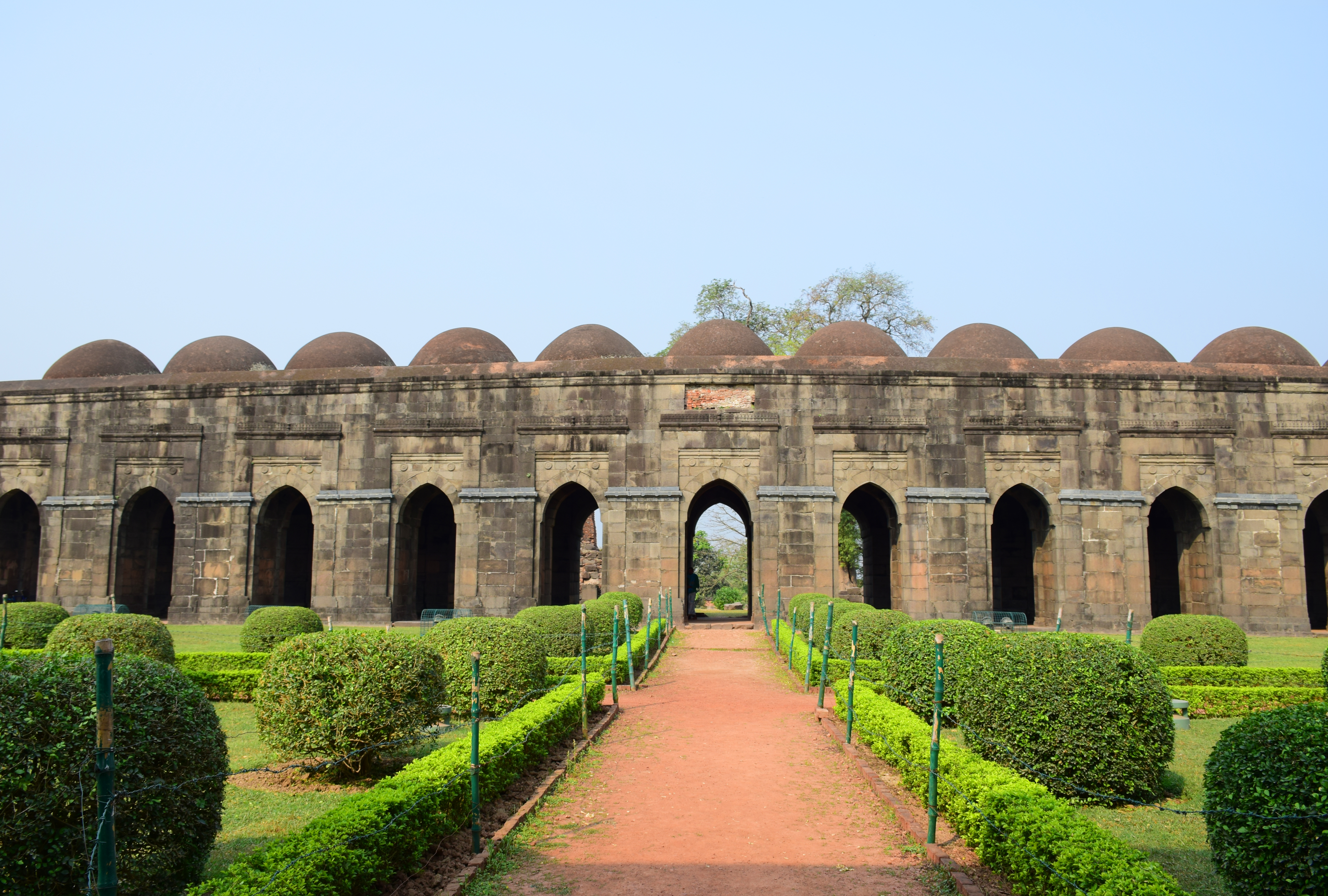
A view of the former mosque with its eleven entrances, each topped by a dome

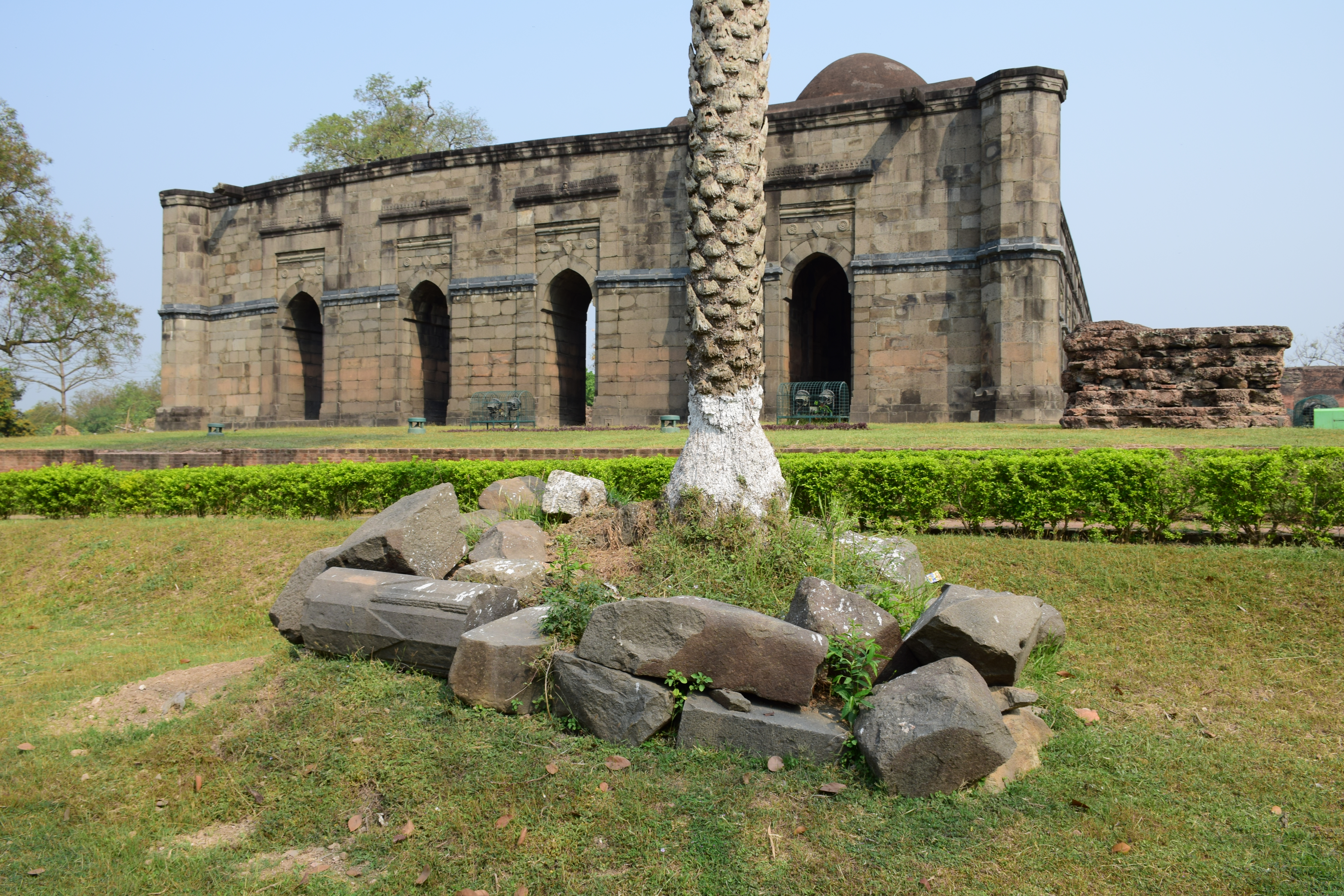
Side view of the former mosque, in 2016

The former mosque measures 50.4 by 22.8 metres (165 by 75 ft), and is 12 metres (39 ft) high. The mosque is composed of eleven entrances, two buttresses, four corner towers and a spacious courtyard which is almost 70 metres (230 ft) in diameter. The building is faced in plain stone and the doors would originally have been framed by mosaics of glazed coloured tiles in floral patterns. The roof was strewn with 44 hemispherical domes, of which 11 on the corridor still remain. These domes were originally gilded, and, hence, gave the mosque its name. From the interior, these domes are arcaded, half in brick and half in stone.

It is the largest building standing in Gaur. It was built in the honour of saint Nur Qutub-e-Alam, son of Saint Makhdoom Alaul Haque Pandvi, by Makhdum Shaikh, the descendant and fellow of the saint. The mosque was known as Sona Masjid due to its earlier gilded wall surface and crowns of the turrets.

The eleven arched entrances of the east façade open into a long domed verandah formed by wide piers on the east and west sides. The verandah in turn, opens onto a prayer chamber composed of three aisles with eleven bays each.

Like the verandah, the prayer chambers, now in ruins, was entirely covered with pendentives. In the northwestern corner of the mosque traces remain on a large Takht. The mosque is stoned faced, but unlike the earlier stoned faced Choto Sona mosque, the surface is not carved to imitate brickwork. The only ornamentation is a string coursing running across the structure at half its height, majestic and sombre, the ornamentation on the aro Shona Masjid stands in contrast to the ornamentally carved brick Jami mosque at Begha, built only three years earlier by the same Sultan. This difference in styles raises interesting questions regarding the sultan's role in the appearance of the architecture he commissioned.

=== Ornamentation ===
The Baro Shona Masjid is the largest of all the monuments in Gaur. It has an open square in front that is 61 metres (200 ft) diameter, with arched gateways in the middle of three of its sides. The sanctuary, a rectangular structure of brick faced with stone, is 51 metres (168 ft) long by 23 metres (76 ft) wide. Its parapet is 6.1 metres (20 ft) high, forming a long shallow curve below which are a series of eleven pointed arches between the octagonal turrets at the angles. The interior of the mosque contains impressive aisles of arches carried in front of the western wall within which is a mihrab opposite each bay.

== See also ==
- Islam in India
- List of mosques in India
- List of Monuments of National Importance in West Bengal
