= Kotwali Gate =

Medieval gate on the Bangladesh-India border

Coordinates: 24.8426°N 88.1412°E

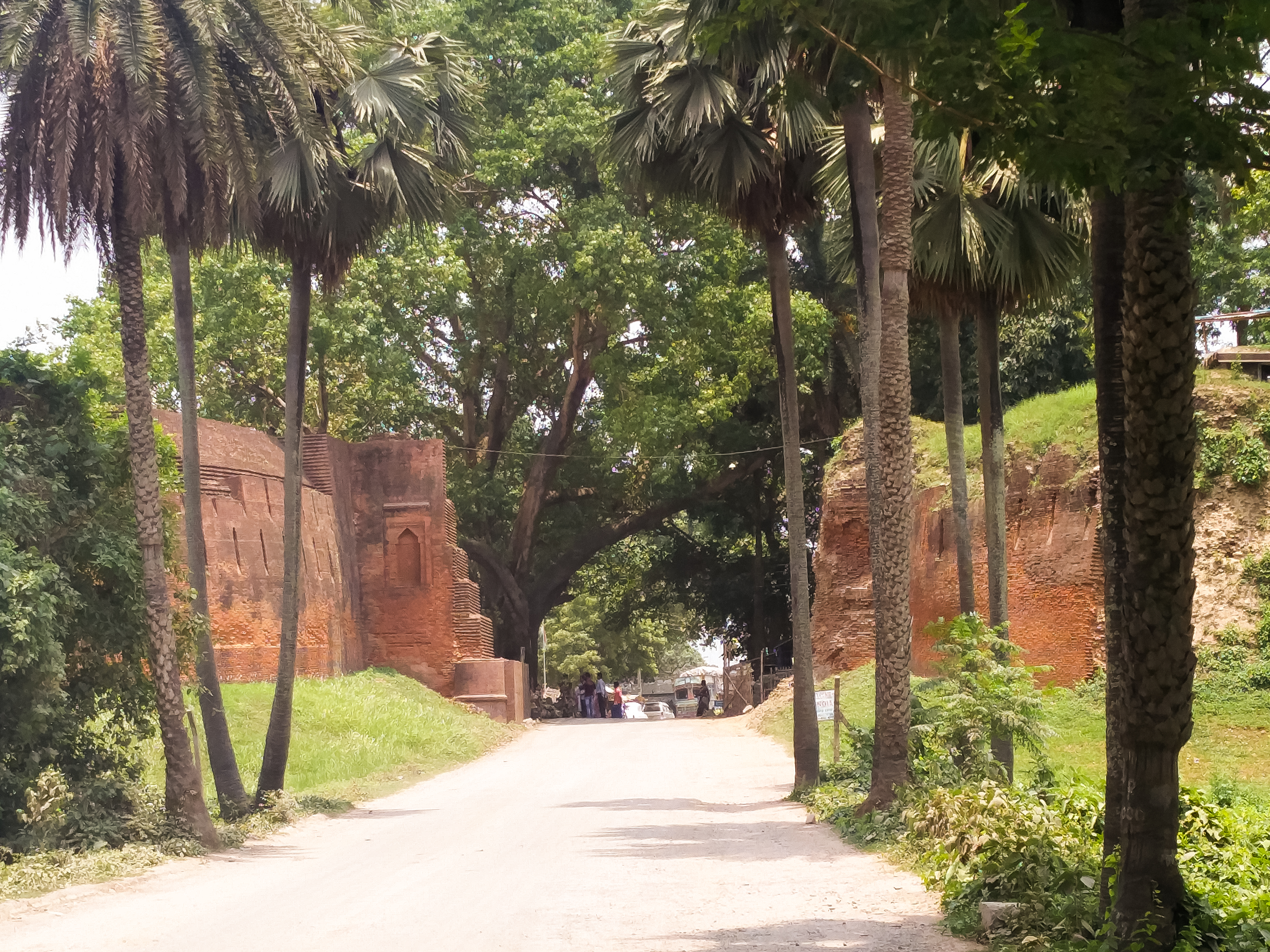
The contemporary condition of Kotwali Gate

The Kotwali Gate, commonly known as Kotwali Darja, is the location of a collapsed medieval gate on the Bangladesh-India border. The gate was the southern entrance to an ancient citadel of Bengal. It is a former arch and gateway to the former walled city of Gaur, which was the capital of Bengal for 112 years.

Today, it marks the international border between India and Bangladesh in the northwestern region, dividing the districts of Chapai Nawabganj and Malda. The gate is an official border crossing between the two countries.

== Etymology ==
The name of the gate originates from the term Kotwal.

== History ==
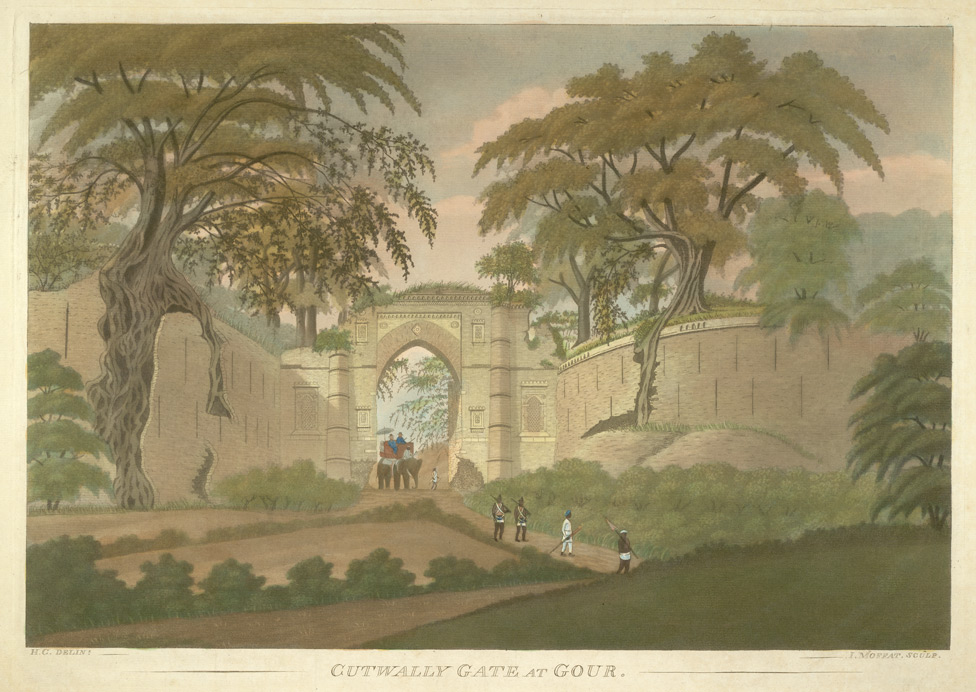
Painting of Kotwali Gate in 1808

According to the Archaeological Survey of India, the structure dates back to the era of the Delhi Sultanate between the reigns of Iltutmish (r. 1211–1236) and Alauddin Khalji (r. 1296–1316). According to the British Library, the gate may have been built after the capital of Bengal was re-established in Gaur by the Sultan of Bengal following the relocation from nearby Pandua in 1446.

== Architecture ==
The central arch, which was 9.15 meters high and 5.10 meters wide, has now collapsed. The gate is part of the southern wall of Gaur. Minor decorative arches are still present on the wall. In addition to the collapsed arch, the gate also had semi-circular towers, battlements and apertures to defend the city.

== See also ==
- Nimtali arch
