= Temples of Bishnupur =

Indian group of temples in West Bengal

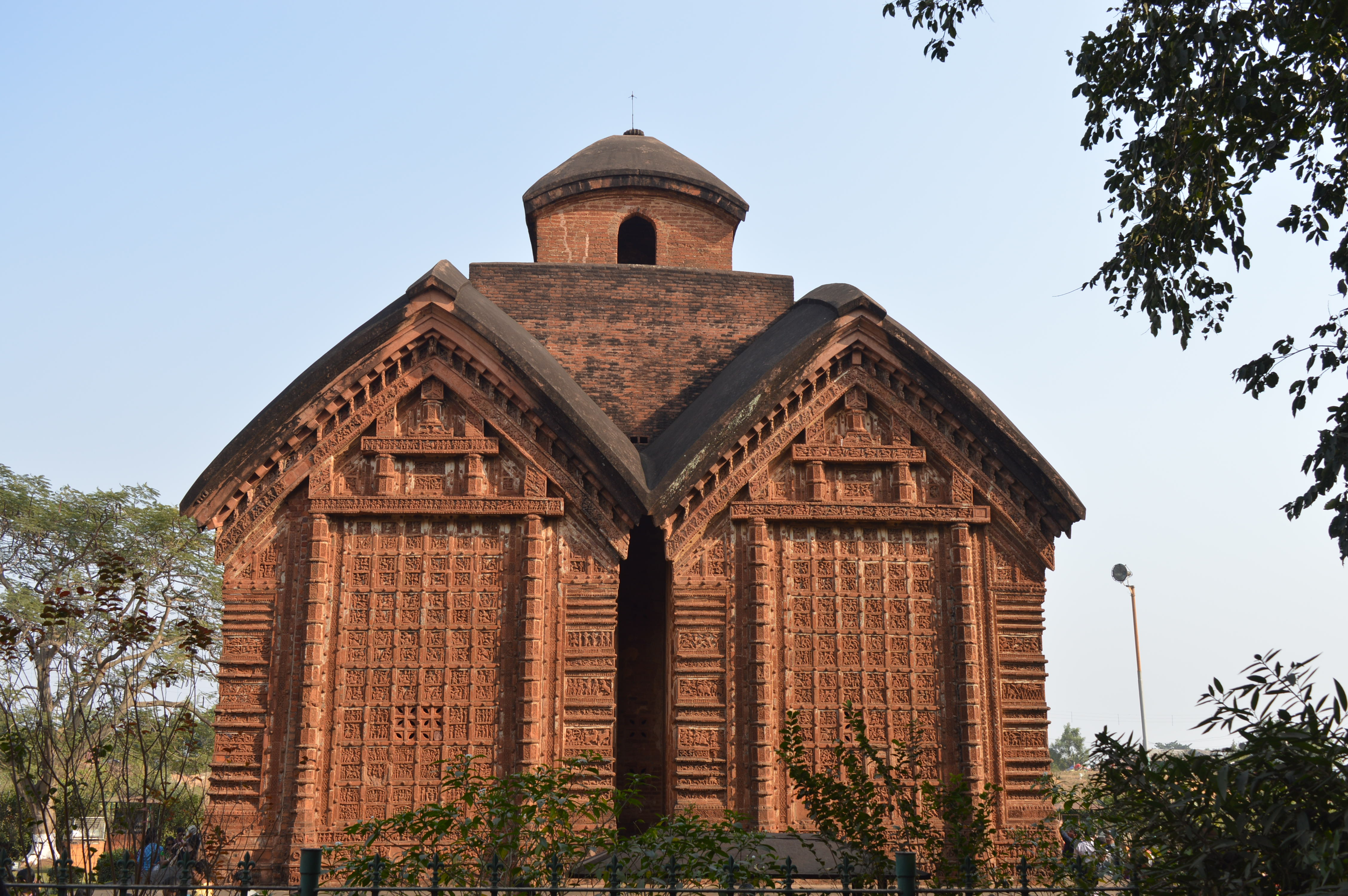
- Jor Bangla Temple

- Location in Bishnupur, West Bengal, India
- 23.075°N 87.317°E
- Location: Bishnupur, West Bengal, India

Site notes
- Elevation: 75 m (246 ft)
- Architectural style: Chala Style
- Owner: Archeological Survey of India

Monument of National Importance
- Official name: Temples at Bishnupur
- Type: Cultural

The Temples of Bishnupur are a group of temples located in the town of Bishnupur, West Bengal, India. These temples, built by the Malla kings between the 17th and 18th centuries, are renowned for their unique architectural style that blends traditional Bengali design with influences from other regions. The temples are primarily constructed using terracotta, a material that gives them a distinctive reddish hue and allows for intricate detailing in the artwork. Known for their elaborate terracotta panels that depict scenes from Hindu epics like the Mahabharata and Ramayana, the temples are a testament to the artistic and cultural achievements of the Malla dynasty. Over the years, they have gained historical significance, drawing visitors and scholars alike. In recognition of their cultural value, the Temples of Bishnupur were added to UNESCO's tentative list of World Heritage Sites in 1997. The Temples are designated as Monuments of National importance by ASI.

== List ==
This is a list of temples in Bishnupur, which are located in the town of Bishnupur in Bankura district of West Bengal, India. The town is famous for the unique terracotta temples made from the locally available laterite stones. The Malla rulers were Vaishnavites and built the famous terracotta temples during the 17th and 18th centuries at this place. Since 1997, the temples of Bishnupur is on the UNESCO World Heritage Site's Tentative list.

Name of the temple	Deity	Picture	Date	Notes/Beliefs
Rasmancha	Radha Krishna (during Rasa festival)		1600	It is the oldest brick temple. Built by King Bir Hambir. The temple has an unusual elongated pyramidical tower, surrounded by hut-shaped turrets, which were very typical of Bengali roof structures of the time.
Jor-Bangla Temple	Keshto Ray (Krishna) & Gouranga		1655	Built by King Raghunath Singha Dev II. The ornate terracotta carvings are set off by the roof in the classic chala style of Bengal architecture.
Shyam Ray Temple	Shyam Ray (Krishna)		1643	Built by King Raghunath Singha. It stands on a low square plinth and consists of an ambulatory pathway with a porch opened by three arches on the four sides of the temple. The central shikhara is octagonal, while the rest four are square. The walls are richly decorated with terracotta carvings featuring aspects of Lord Krishna’s life. Pancha Ratna style.
Madanmohan Temple	Madanmohan (Krishna)		1694	King Durjana Singha Deva built the temple in the ekaratna style, a square flat-roofed building with carved cornices, surmounted by a pinnacle. Impressive carvings on the walls depict scenes from the Ramayana, Mahabharata and the Puranas.
Lalji Temple	Radha Krishna		1658	Built by Bir Singha II in ekaranta style. It is built on a square raised plinth, consisting of ornamental stucco decorations on low relief carvings.
Radhya Shyam temple	Radha Krishna		1758	Built by Chaitanya Singha in ekaratna style. It was built in a square plan, consisting of a dome-shaped shikhara and stucco motifs depicting floral, geometric and depiction of the life from Puranas.
Nandalal Temple	Nandalal (Krishna)		17th Century	Consisting of a square ground plan and a single tower resting on a curved roof. Very little motif work can be seen on the lower part of the temple.
Kalachand Temple			1656.	Built by King Raghunath Singha in ekratna style with laterite stone.
Radhabinod Temple			1659	Built by queen of Raghunath Singha I built the temple in brick.
Madan Gopal Temple			1665	A Pancharatna mandir built by Shiromani Devi, Queen of Veer Singha II.
Muruli Mohan Temple			1665	Built by Shiromani Devi, Queen of Veer Singha II. It is an ekratna temple with floral designs and stucco works.
Radha Govind Temple			1729	Built by Krishna Singha, son of Gopal Singha in ekratna style with laterite.
Radha Madhab Temple			1737	Built by the daughter-in-law of Mallaraj Gopal Singha, Churamoni Devi in ekratna style with brick and has bas relief carvings.
Chhinnamasta Temple	Chhinnamasta			Built by the Guin family of Midnapore.
Sanreswar Temple	Lord Shiva		1346	The temple is made of laterite stone, which possibly had a sikhara of the Nagara style presently missing.
Malleswar Temple			1622	Built by Mallaraj Bir Singha. It is an Ekratna temple built of laterite stone.
Mrinmayee Temple	Maa Durga		Originally 997 CE	Originally built by Jagat Malla in 997 CE. The Durga puja takes place for 15 days and all the other temples in Bishnupur does not start the puja until the cannon has been fired from the temple.
Krishna-Balaram Temple				Deula style
Sarbamangala Temple				
Jor Mandir (Twin Temples)			1726	A complex of three temples known as the Jor Mandir. These temples were built by Malla King Krishna Singha in 1726.}

== See also ==
- Mallabhum temples
