= Murali Mohan Temple =

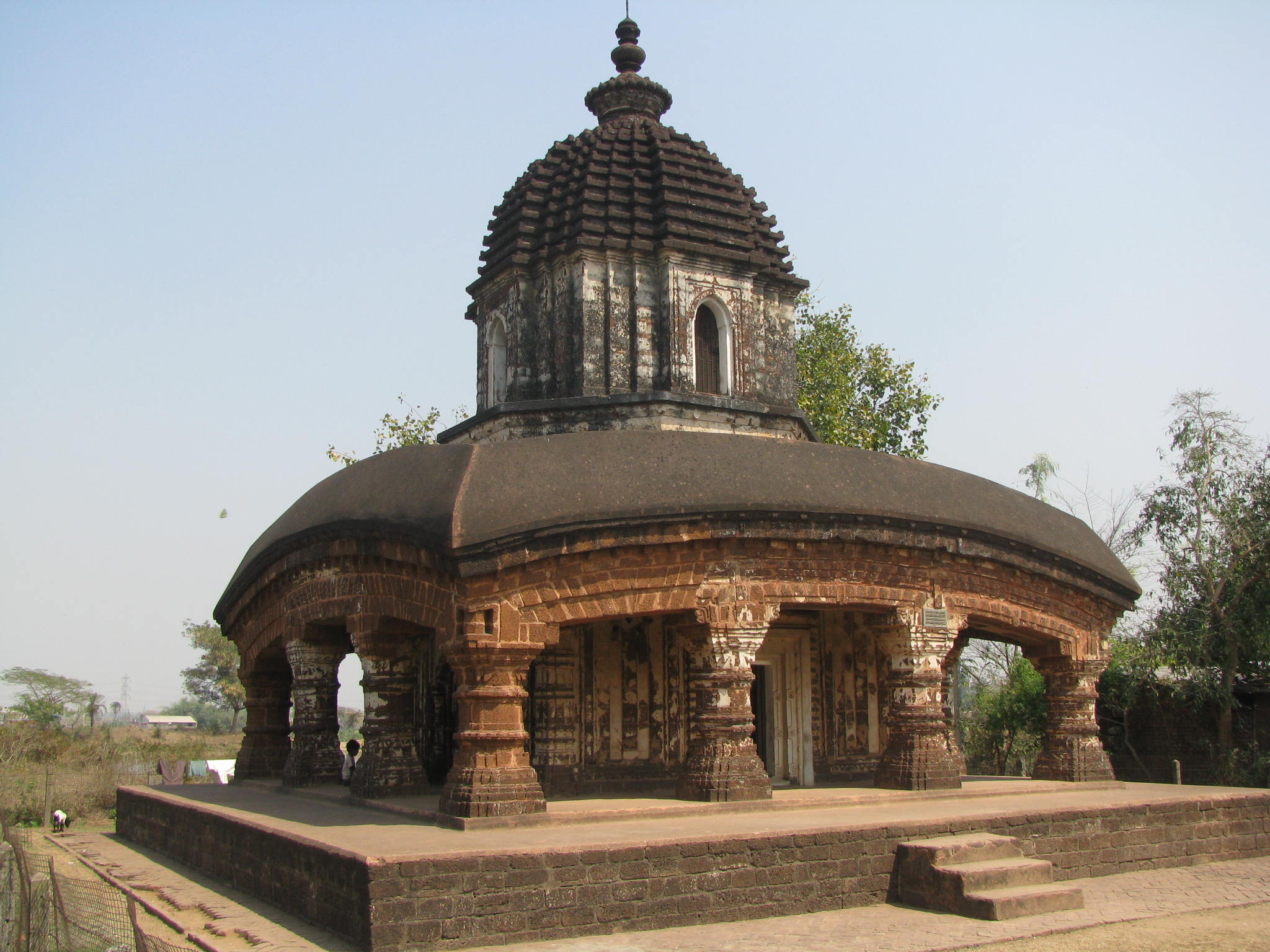

Religion
- Affiliation: Hinduism
- District: Bankura
- Deity: Murali Mohan

Location
- Location: Bishnupur
- State: West Bengal
- Country: India
- Interactive map of Murali Mohan Temple
- Coordinates: 23°4′55.37″N 87°19′03.85″E

Architecture
- Type: Bengal temple architecture
- Style: Ek-ratna style
- Founder: Churamoni(Siromoni/Siramani Devi), wife of Bir Singha
- Established: 1665; 361 years ago

Specifications
- Length: 10.1 m (33 ft)
- Width: 10.1 m (33 ft)
- Height (max): 12.2 m (40 ft)
- Monument of National Importance
- Official name: Murali Mohan Temple
- Type: Cultural
- Reference no.: IN-WB-17

Murali Mohan Temple, is a Krishna temple in Bishnupur in the Indian state of West Bengal. In this temple, the Hindu God Krishna was worshiped as Murali Mohan in this temple.

== History and architecture ==
According to the Inscriptional plaque, the temple was founded in 1665 by Churamoni (Siromoni/Siramani Devi), wife of Bir Singha King of Mallabhum. The Temple is built in the Ek-ratna style temple architecture.

The Murali Mohana temple, which faces south and differs from other temples in the eka-ratna group. Instead of the typical three arched openings, it features a covered ambulatory supported by a series of pillars. The inner sanctum is crowned with a tower. The temple has a base area of approximately 10.1 square meters and stands at a height of 12.2 meters. An emblem, or dhvaja, is positioned above the chuda, marking the deity enshrined within the temple.

Currently, it is preserved as one of the archaeological monuments by the Archaeological Survey of India.

== Gallery ==
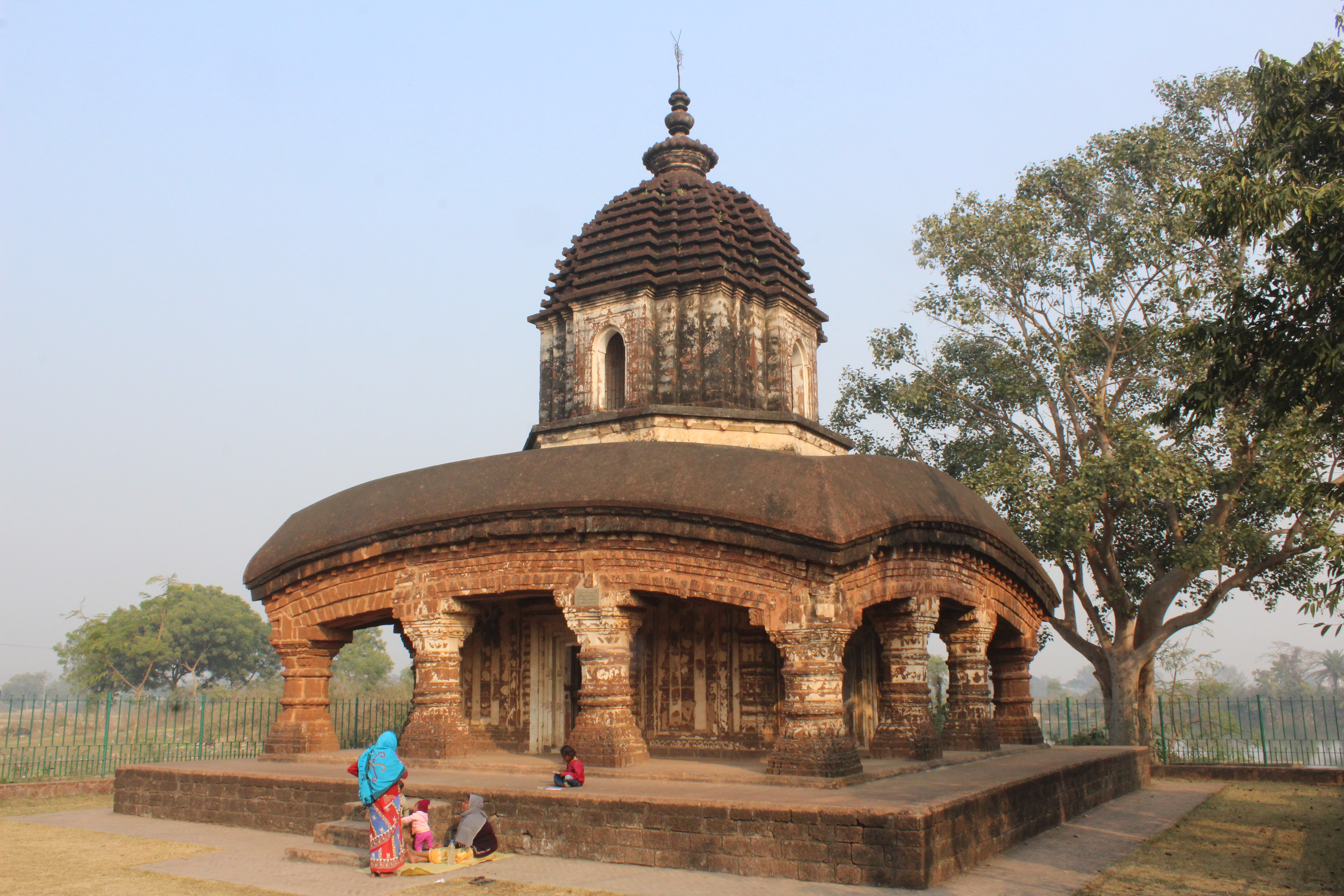

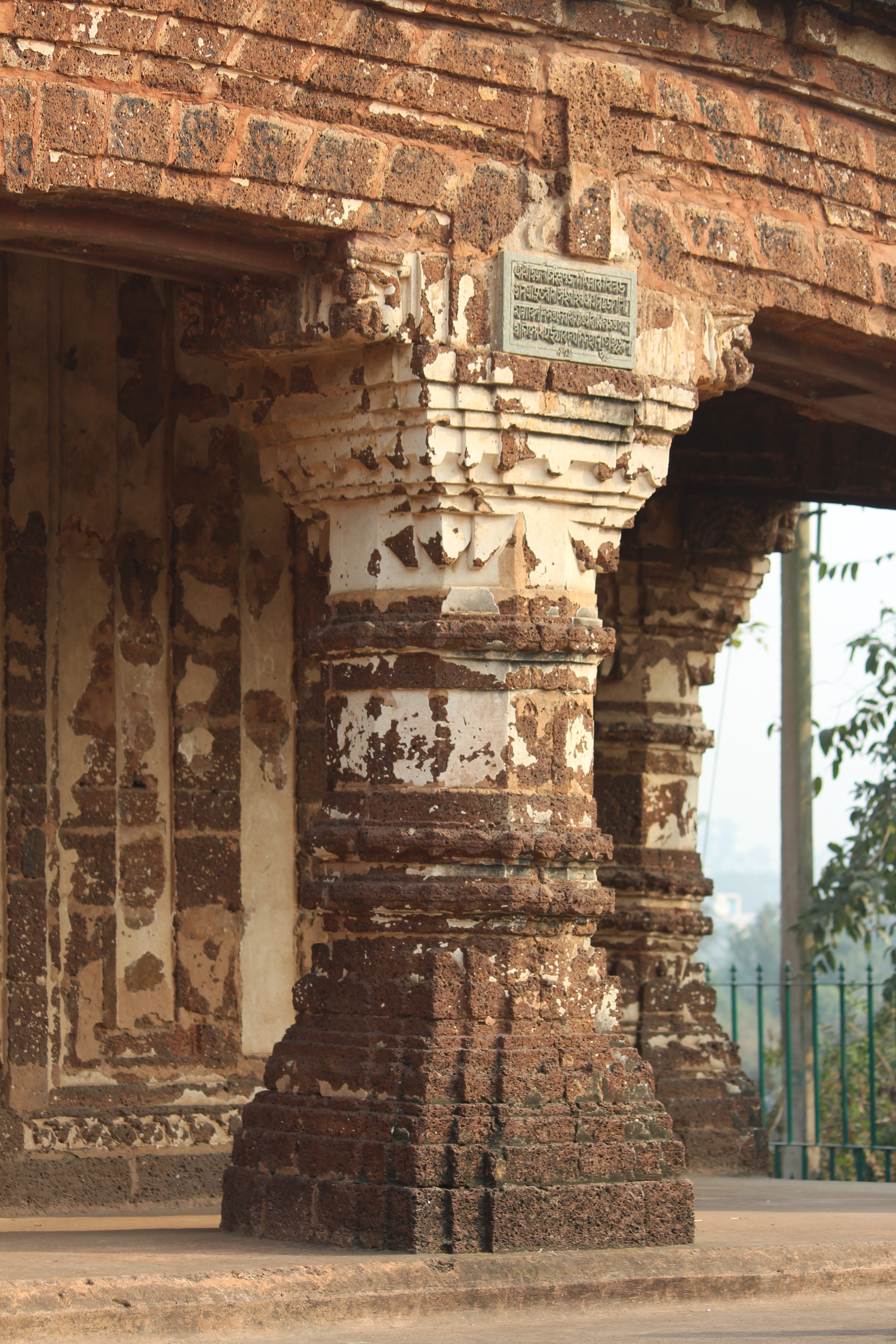

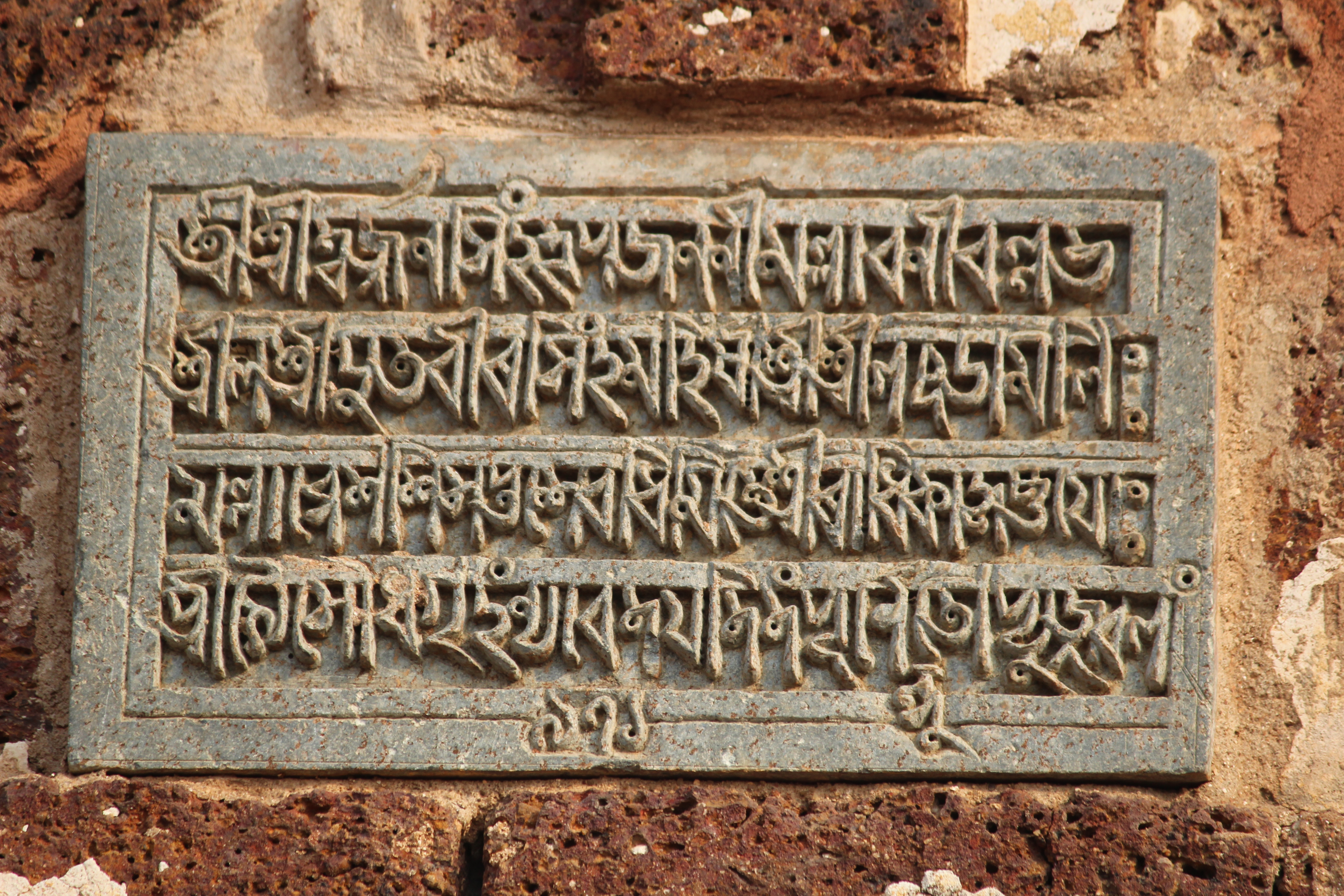

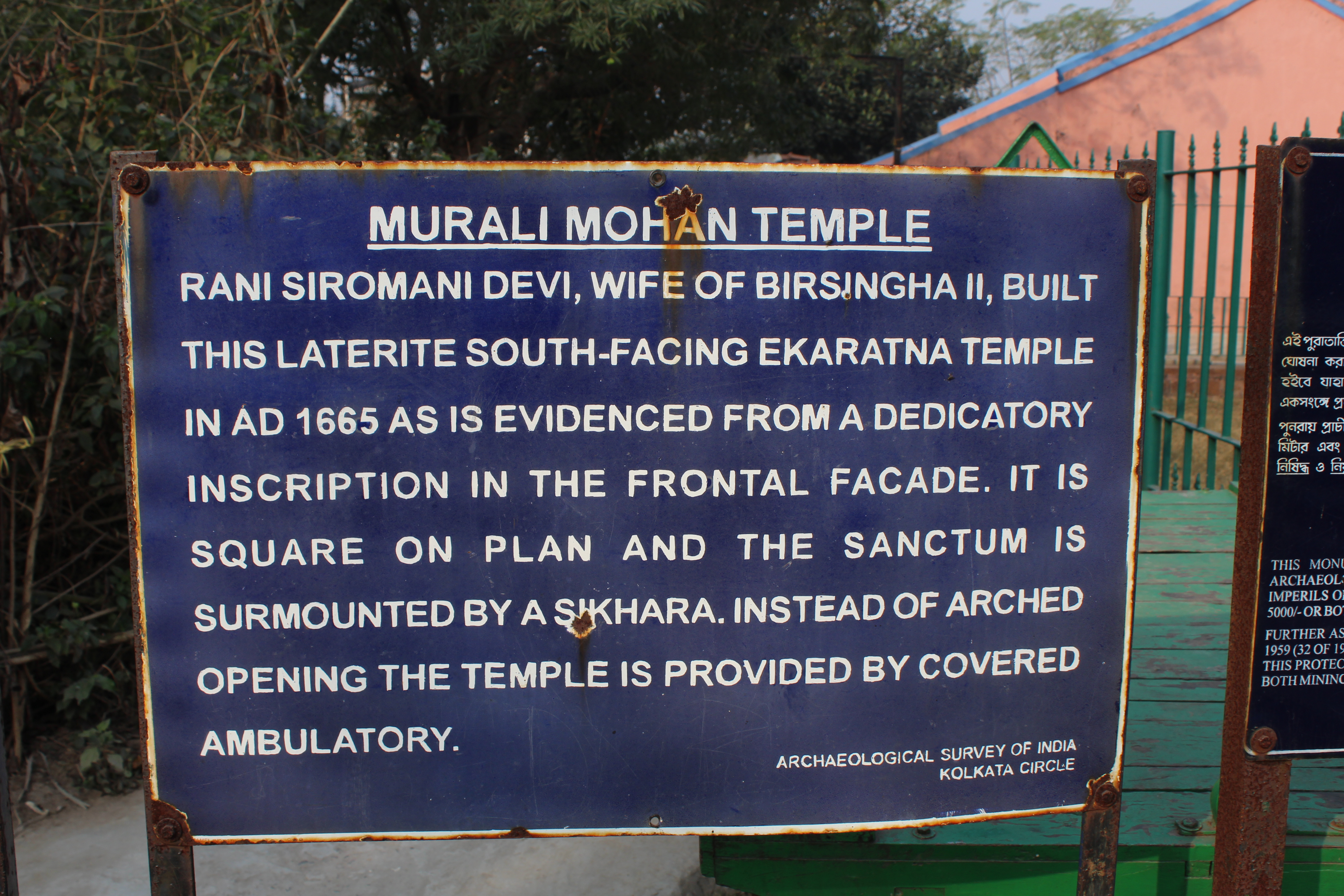

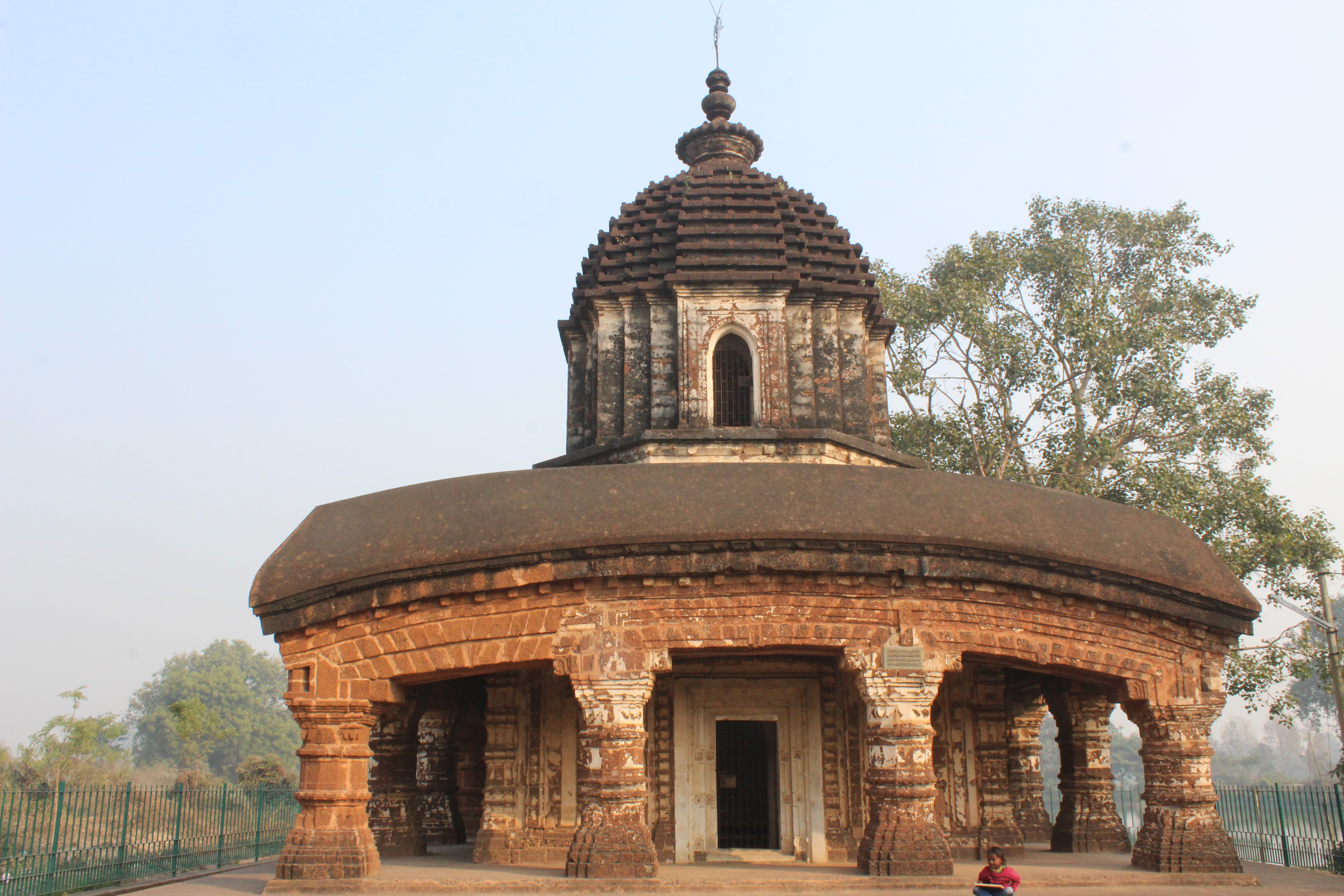

== Sources ==
- Biswas, S. S. (1992). Bishnupur (University of Illinois at Urbana-Champaign ed.). Director General, Archaeological Survey of India.
- Dasgupta, Gautam Kumar; Biswas, Samira; Mallik, Rabiranjan (2009), Heritage Tourism: An Anthropological Journey to Bishnupur, A Mittal Publication, p. 37, ISBN 978-8183242943
