= Lalji Temple =

Temple in Bishnupur, West Bengal, India

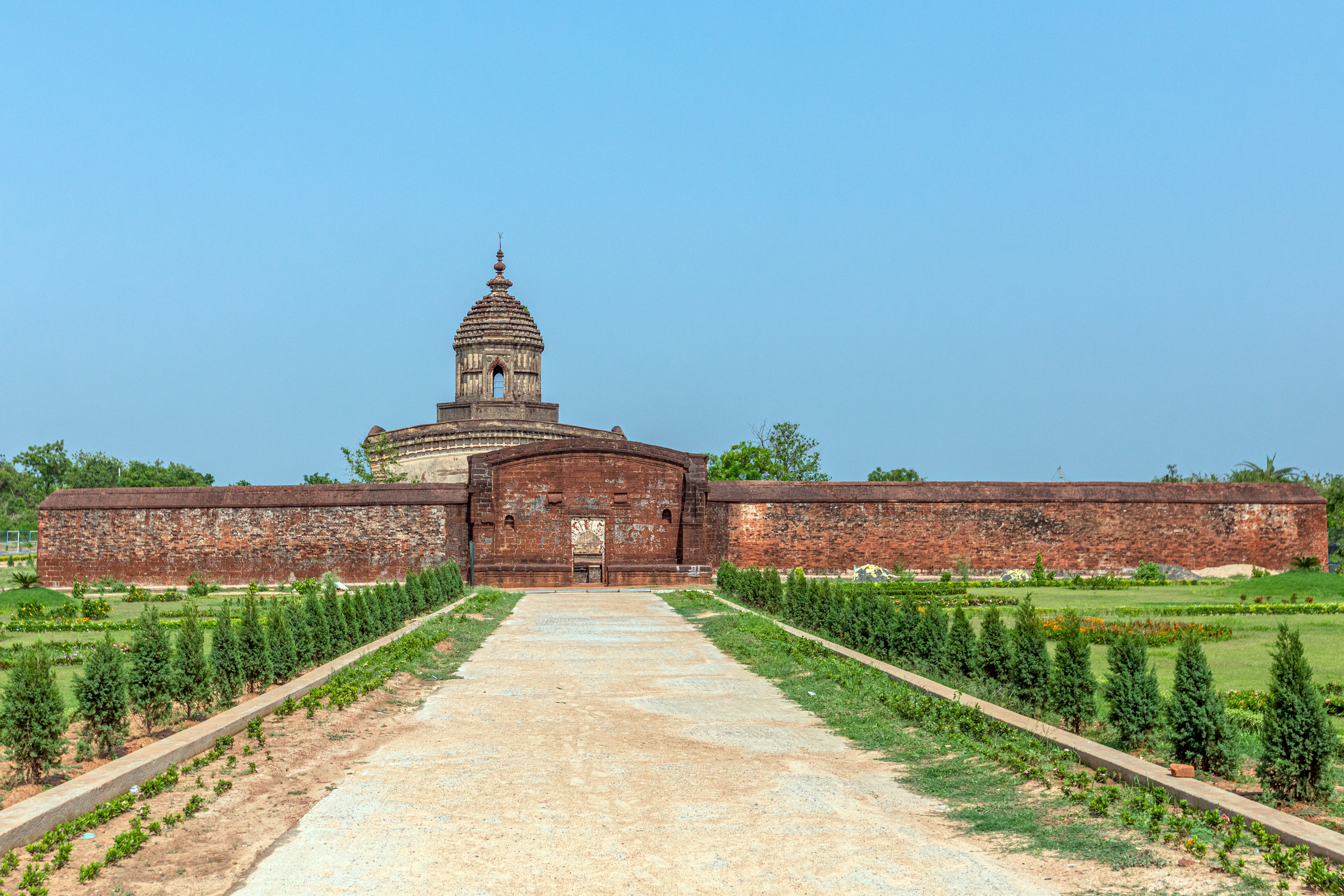

Religion
- Affiliation: Hinduism
- District: Bankura

Location
- Location: Bishnupur
- State: West Bengal
- Country: India
- Interactive map of Lalji Temple
- Coordinates: 23°4′24.11″N 87°19′37.02″E

Architecture
- Type: Bengal temple architecture
- Style: ek-ratna style
- Founder: Bir Singha Dev
- Established: 1658; 368 years ago

Specifications
- Length: 12.3 m (40 ft)
- Width: 12.3 m (40 ft)
- Height (max): 12.3 m (40 ft)
- Monument of National Importance
- Official name: Lalji Temple
- Type: Cultural
- Reference no.: IN-WB-13

Lalji Temple, Located in Bishnupur in Indian state of West Bengal.

== History and architecture ==
According to the inscriptional plaque found in the temple, the temple was founded in 1658 by Bir Singha Dev King of Mallabhum. The Temple is built in the Ek-ratna style temple architecture.

Among the stone-built eka-ratna temples, this example is enclosed by a covered ambulatory, with three arched entrances that retain traces of ornamental detailing on their upper portions. Dedicated to Sri Radhika and Sri Krishna, it is raised on a large plinth and follows a square plan, each side measuring approximately 12.3 metres, with an overall height of 12.3 metres. The roof slopes gently on all four sides and supports a single tower above. Although the front wall was originally decorated with ornamental motifs, only fragments of these designs remain today.

Currently, it is preserved as one of the archaeological monuments by the Archaeological Survey of India. Since 1998, the Lalji Temple is on the UNESCO World Heritage Site's Tentative list.

== Gallery ==
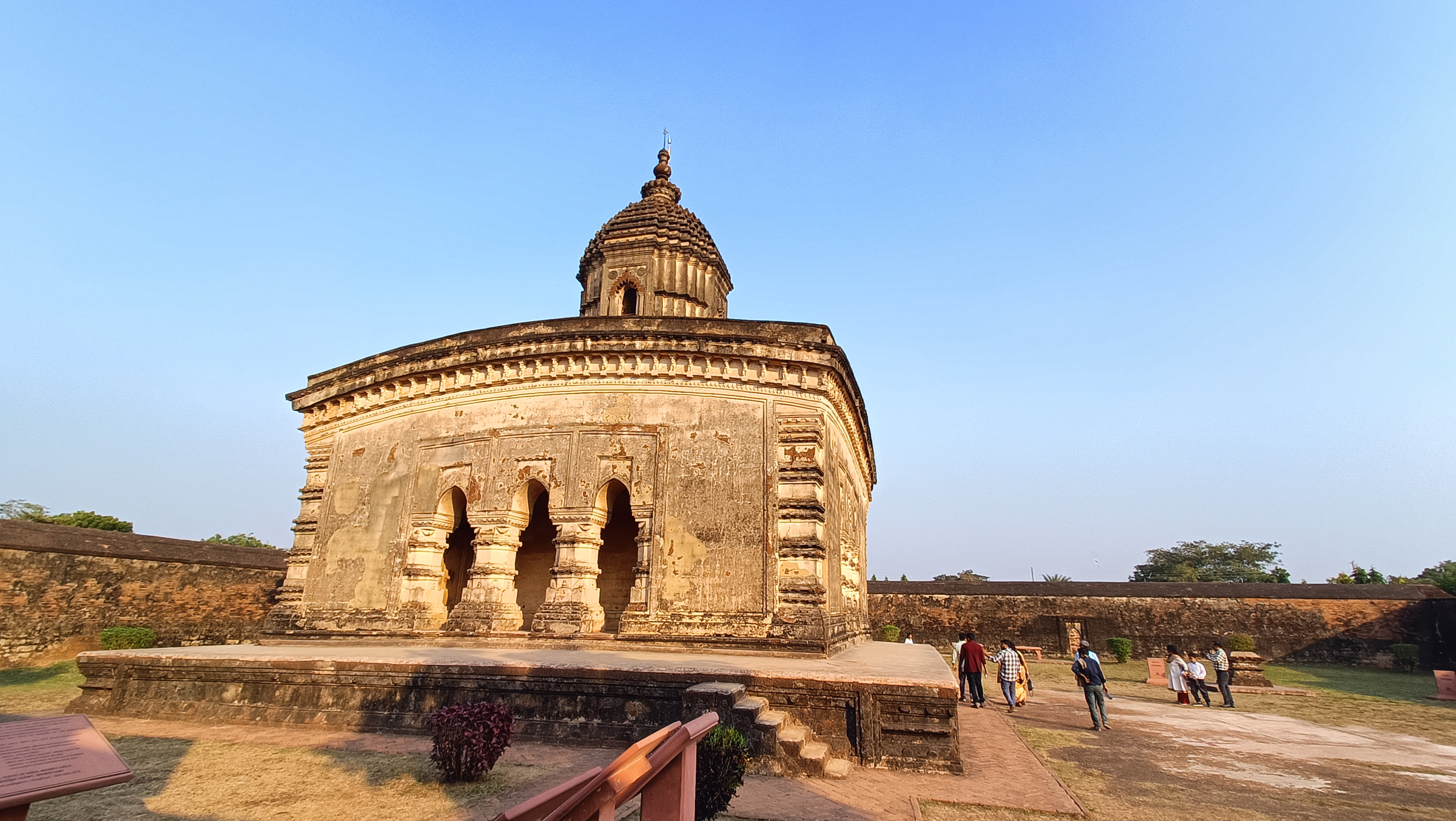

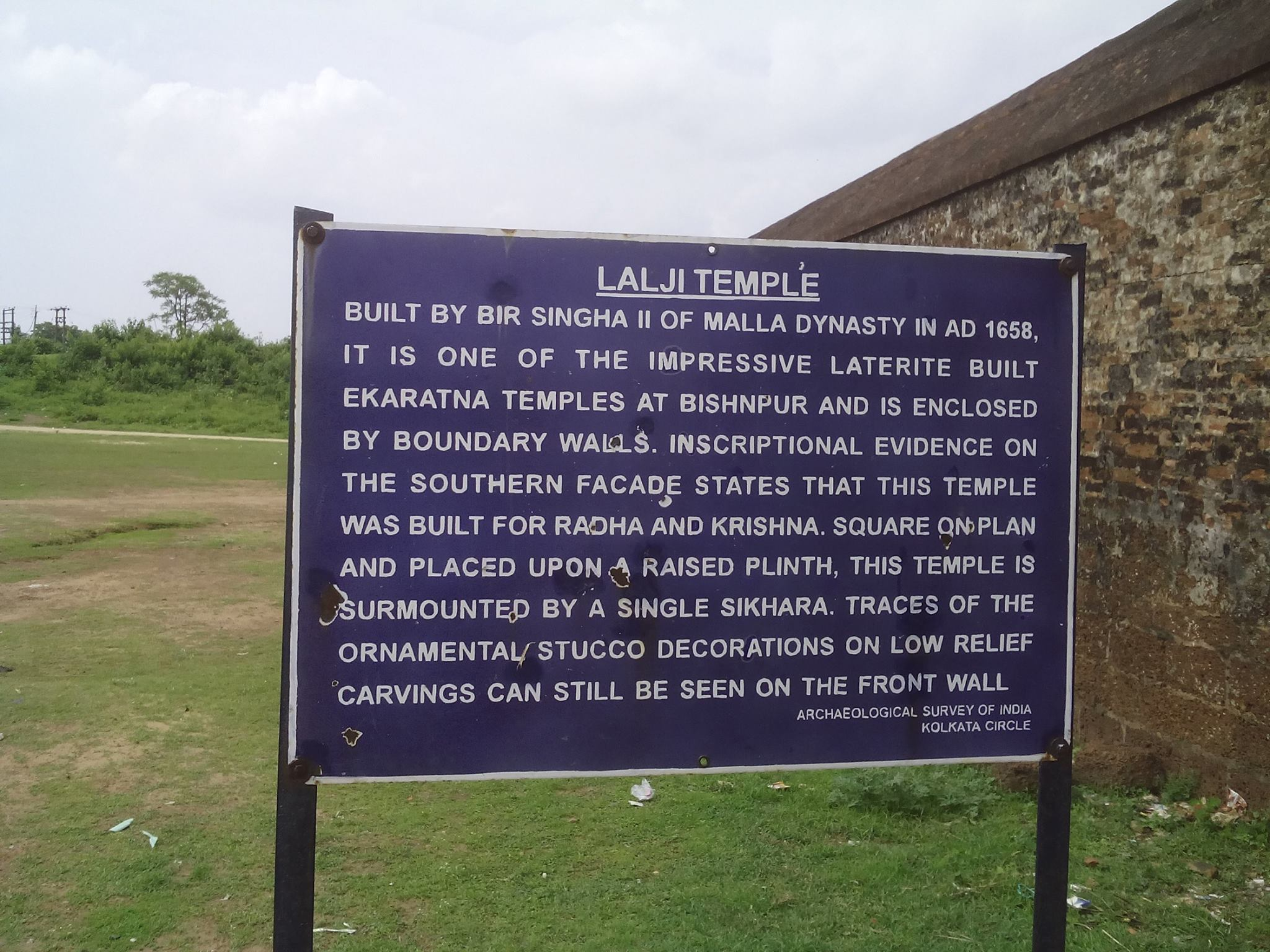

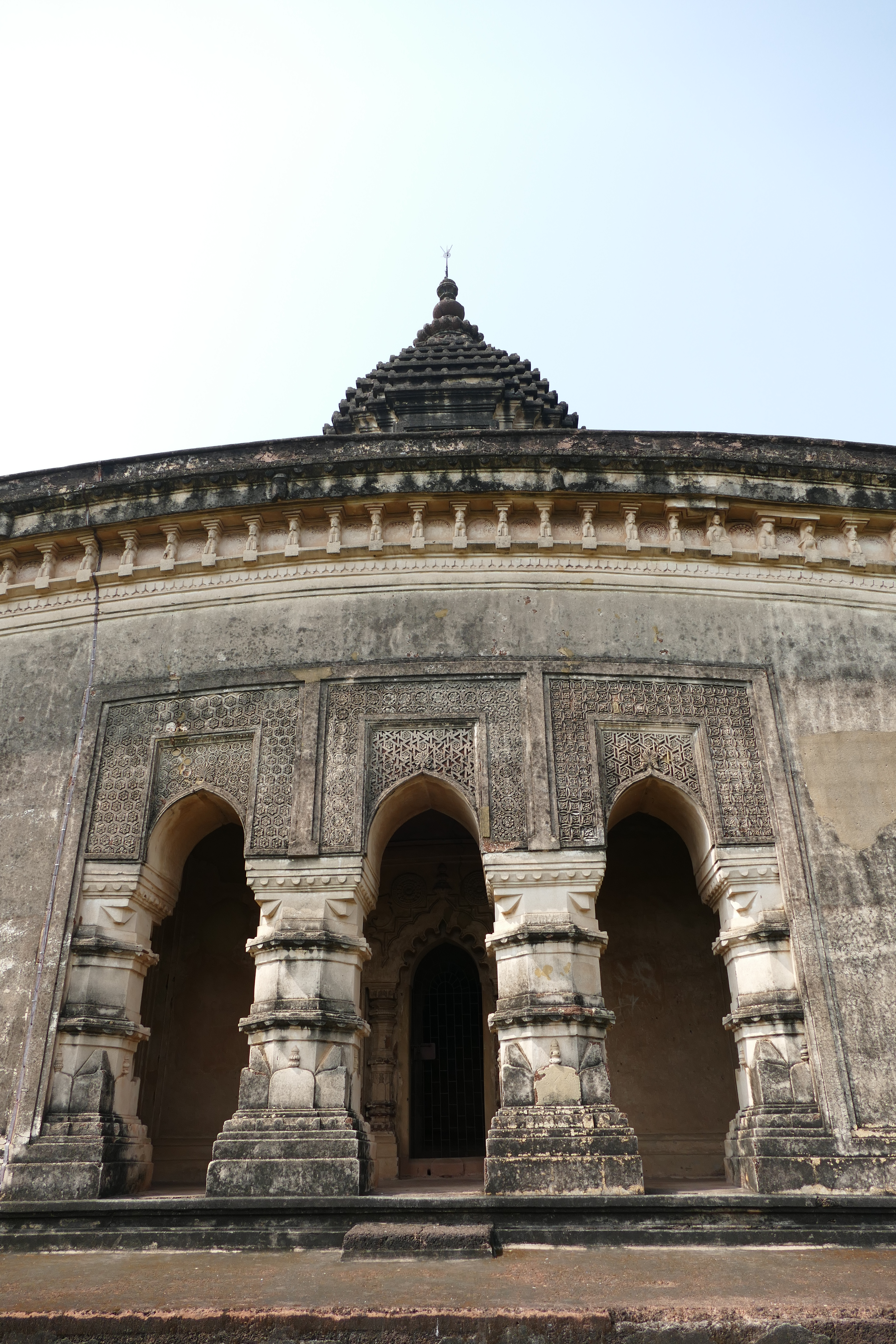

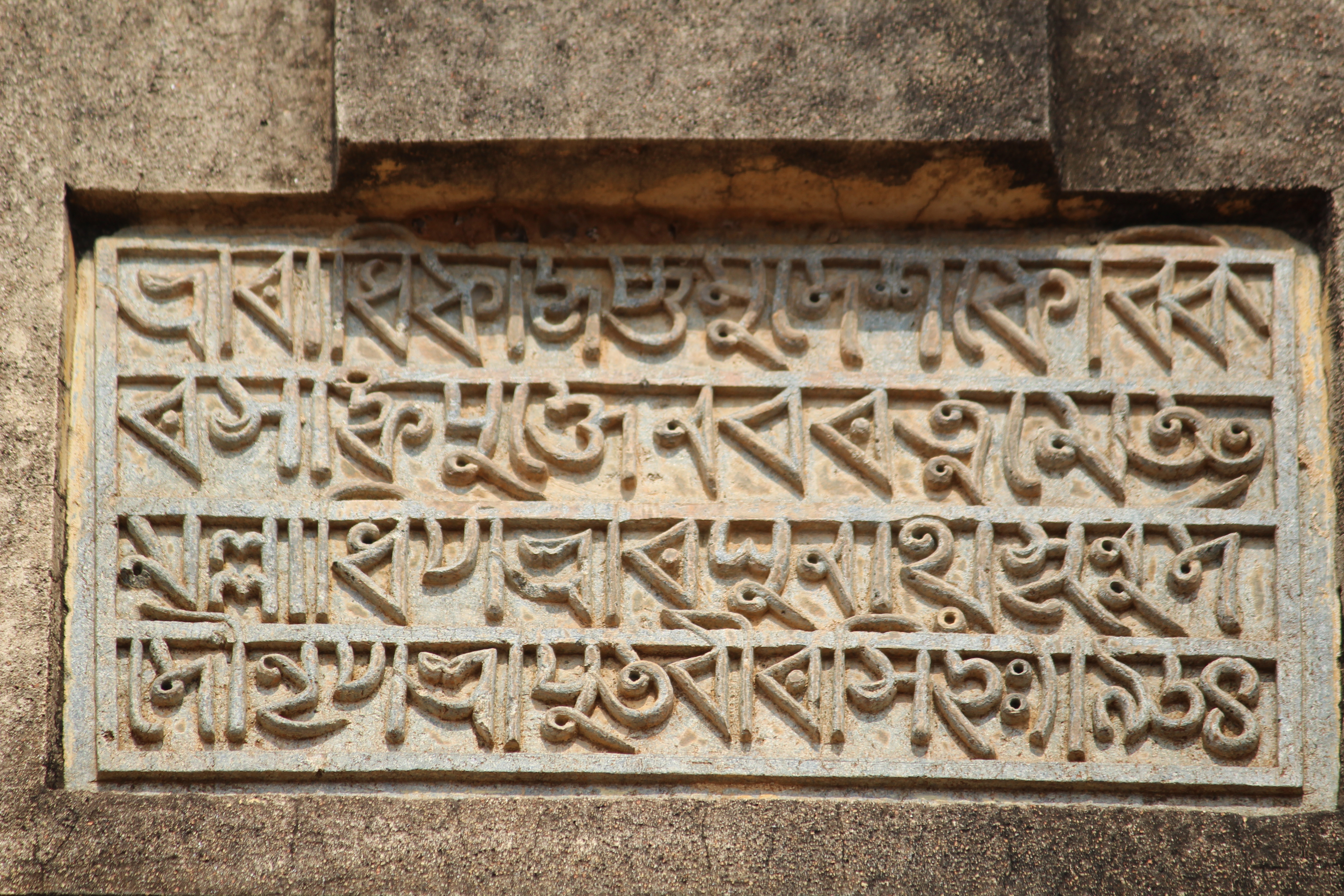

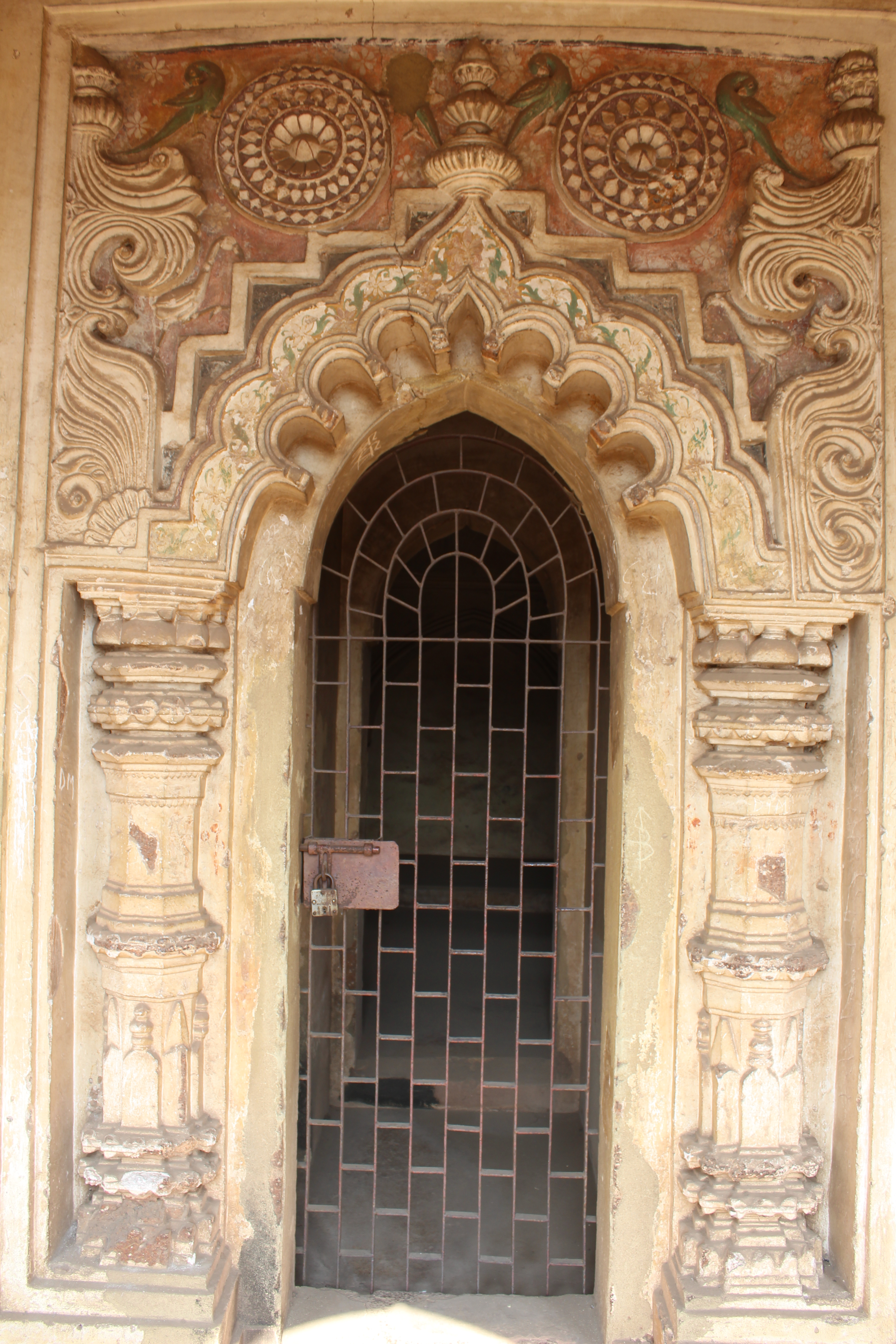

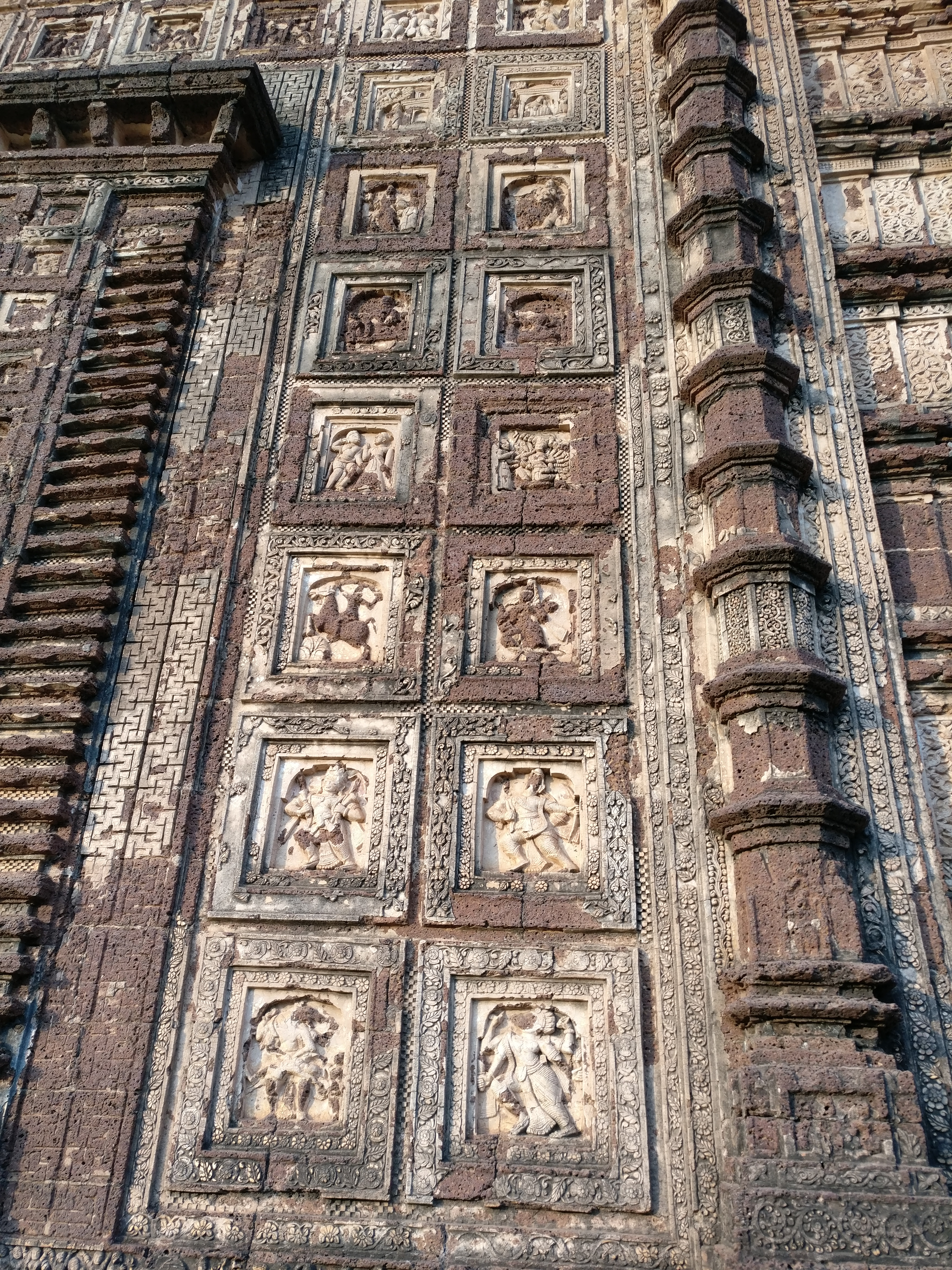

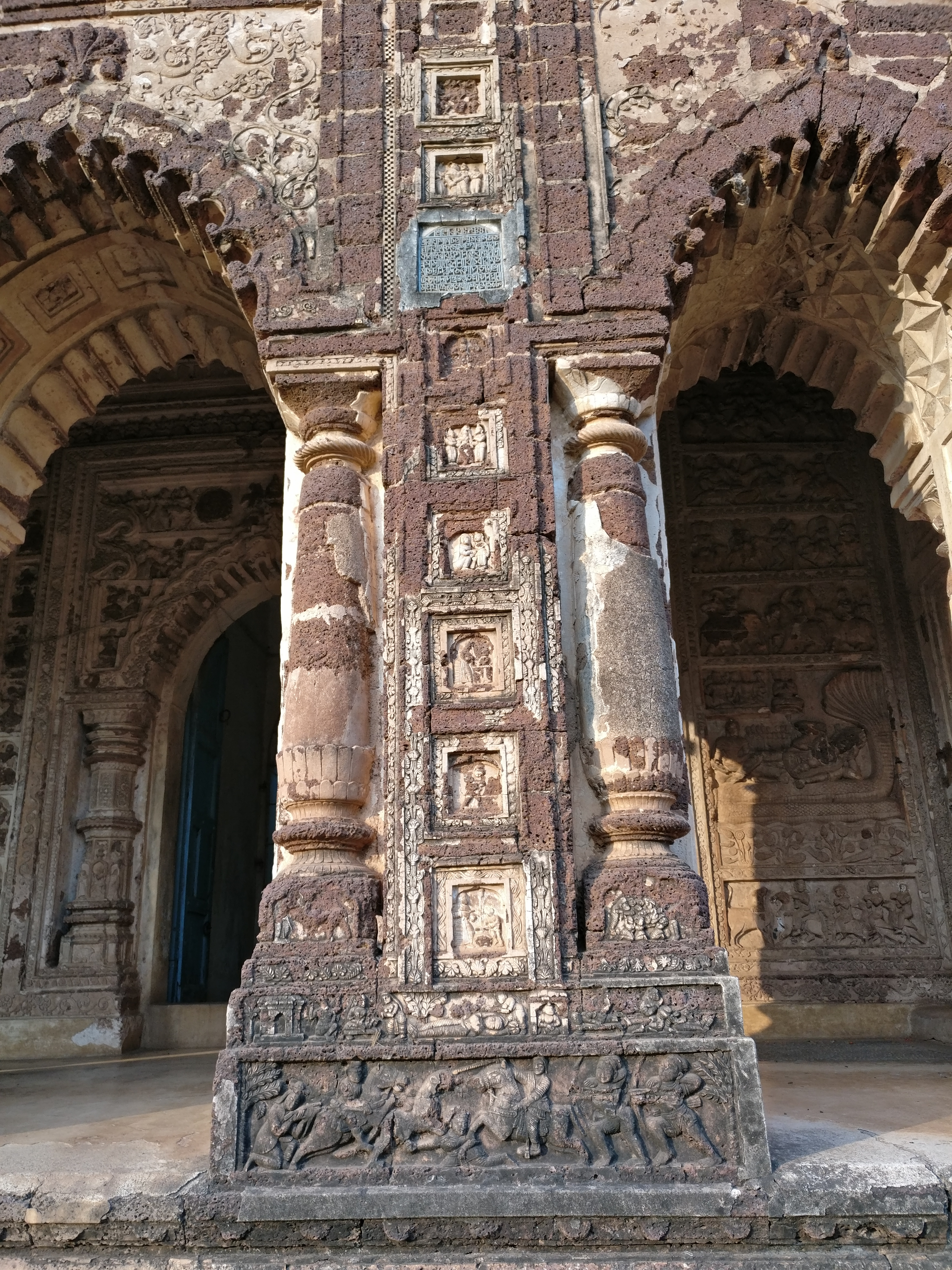

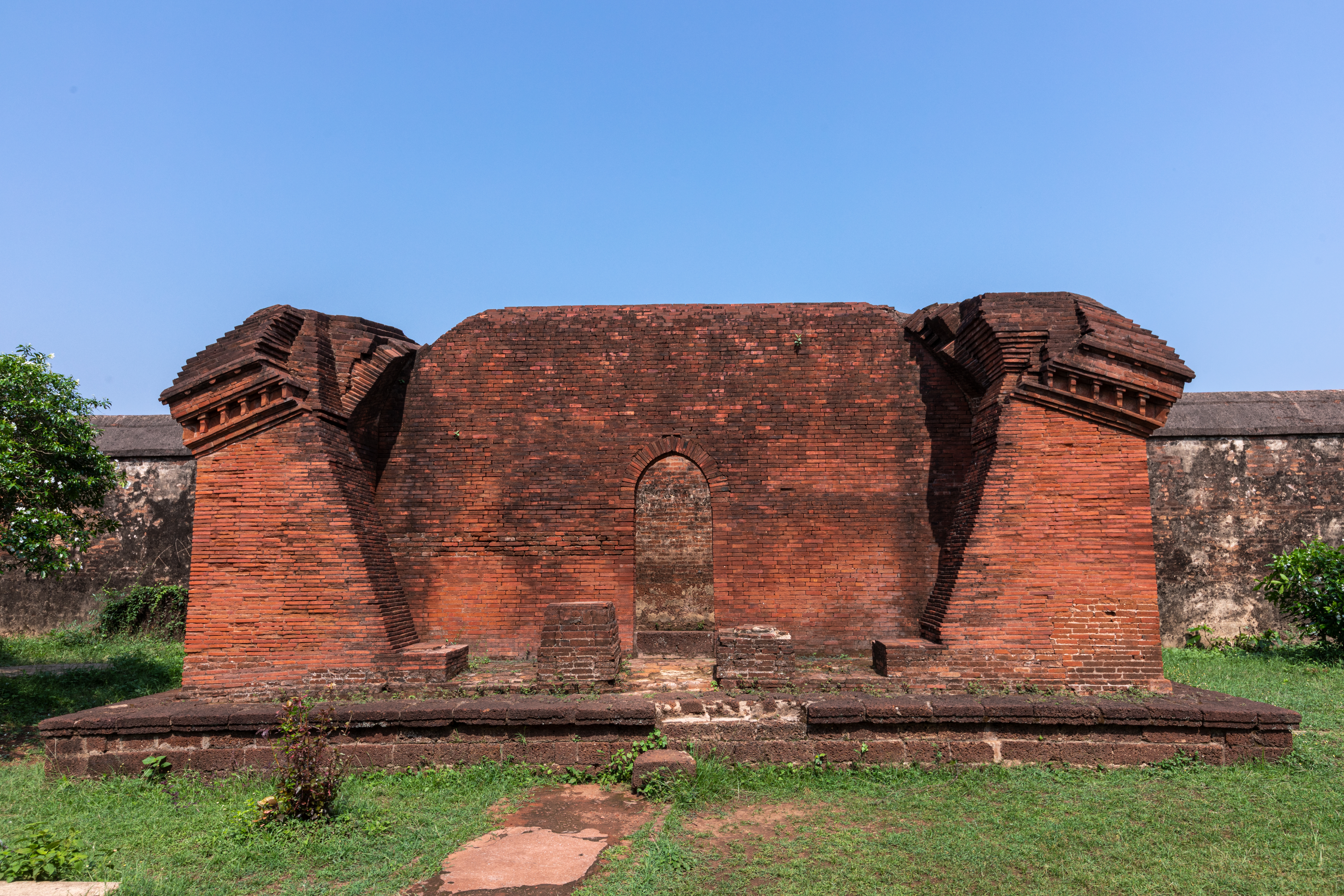

== Sources ==
- Biswas, S. S. (1992). Bishnupur (University of Illinois at Urbana-Champaign ed.). Director General, Archaeological Survey of India.
