= Radhabinod Temple =

Temple in Bishnupur, West Bengal, India

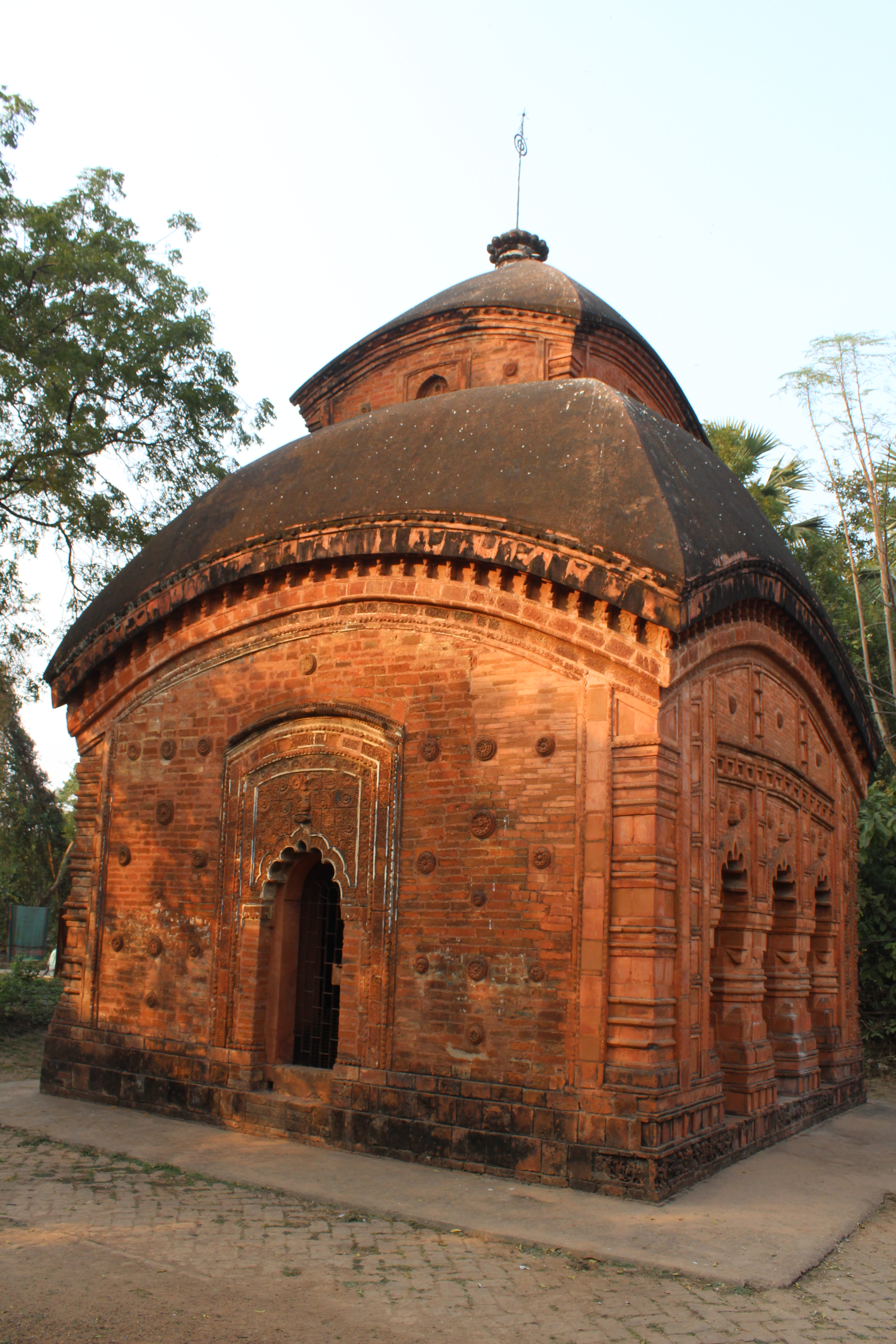

Religion
- Affiliation: Hinduism
- District: Bankura

Location
- Location: Bishnupur
- State: West Bengal
- Country: India
- Interactive map of Radhabinod Temple
- Coordinates: 23°4′50.84″N 87°19′39.79″E

Architecture
- Type: Bengal temple architecture
- Style: At-chala style
- Founder: Raghunath Singha Dev
- Established: 1659; 367 years ago

Specifications
- Length: 6.4 m (21 ft)
- Width: 6.2 m (20 ft)
- Height (max): 10.7 m (35 ft)
- Monument of National Importance
- Official name: Radha Vinod Temple
- Type: Cultural
- Reference no.: IN-WB-20

Radhabinod Temple also known as Radha Vinod Temple, Located in Bishnupur in Indian state of West Bengal.

== History and architecture ==
The temple was built in 1659 by Raghunath Singha Dev King of Mallabhum. The Temple is built in the At-chala style temple architecture.

The Radha-Vinoda Temple in Bishnupur, located in the Khar Bangla area, is one of the two at-chala style temples in the region. Despite significant damage to the upper roof and entrance wall, the temple remains an important architectural and historical site. This temple is particularly notable for its intricate design and its unique at-chala construction, where the roof consists of eight sections. However, due to a narrow break between the upper and lower roof sections, the temple gives the impression of a char-chala structure, which typically features four sloping roofs. Facing east, the temple stands on a nearly square plinth measuring approximately 6.4 meters in length and 6.2 meters in breadth. The overall height of the temple is about 10.7 meters. Despite the collapse of some parts of the structure, the temple's rich decorative elements would have originally showcased the craftsmanship of the time. The temple's construction reflects the cultural influence of Vaishnavism and the patronage of local rulers like Raghunatha Singha during the 17th century.

Today, the Radha-Vinoda Temple is an important relic of Bishnupur's architectural heritage, offering insight into the artistic and religious traditions of the period.

Currently, it is preserved as one of the archaeological monuments by the Archaeological Survey of India.

== Gallery ==
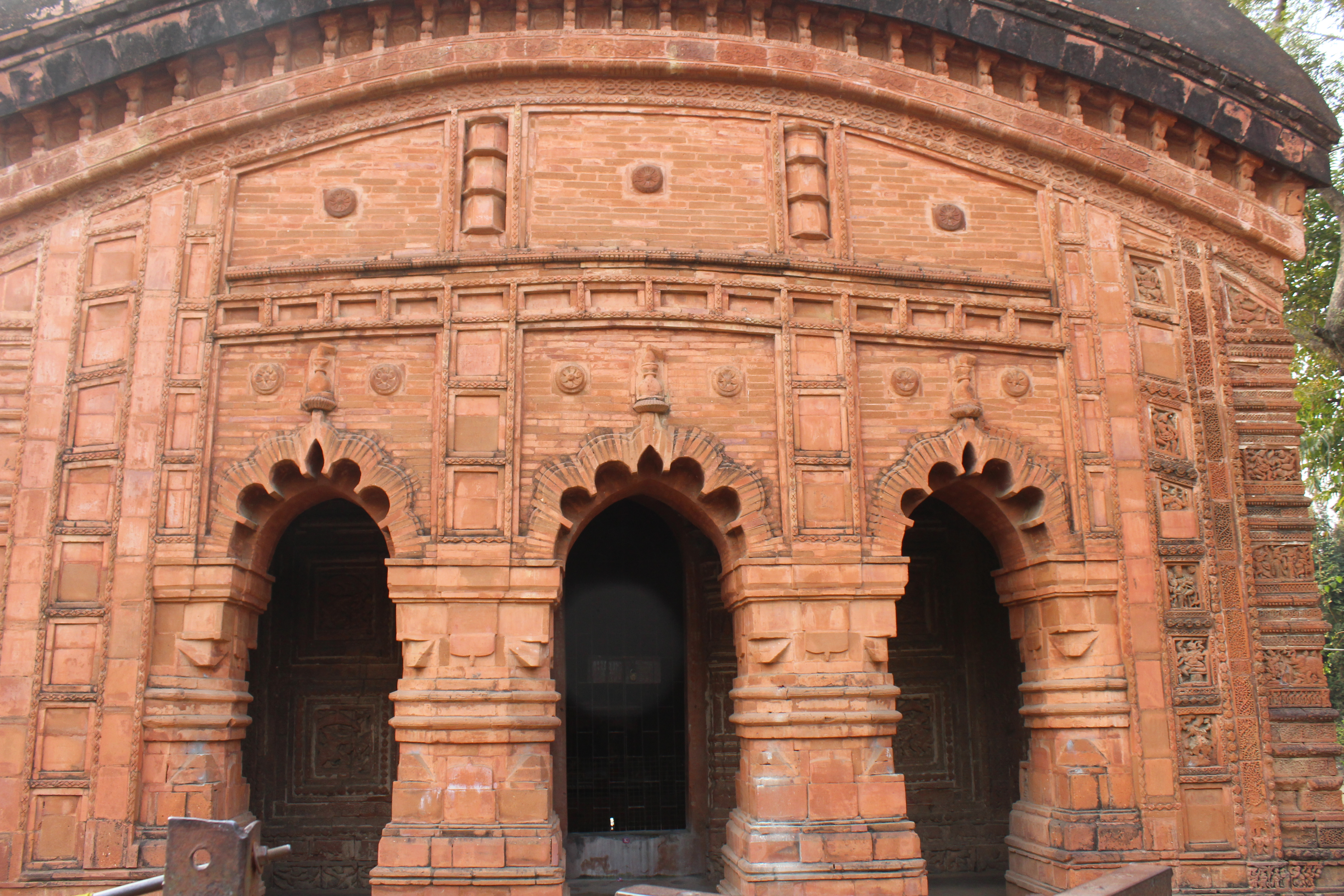

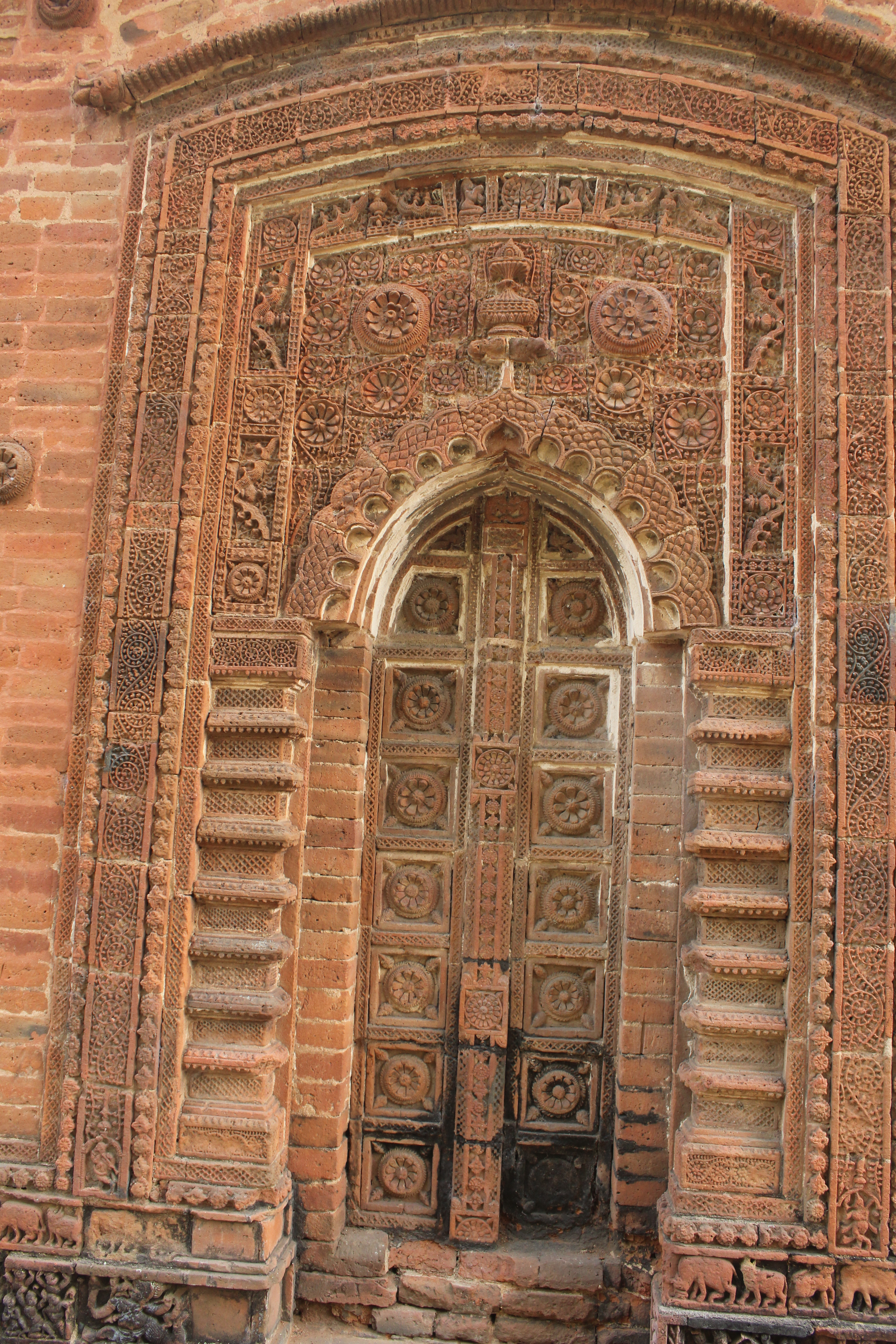

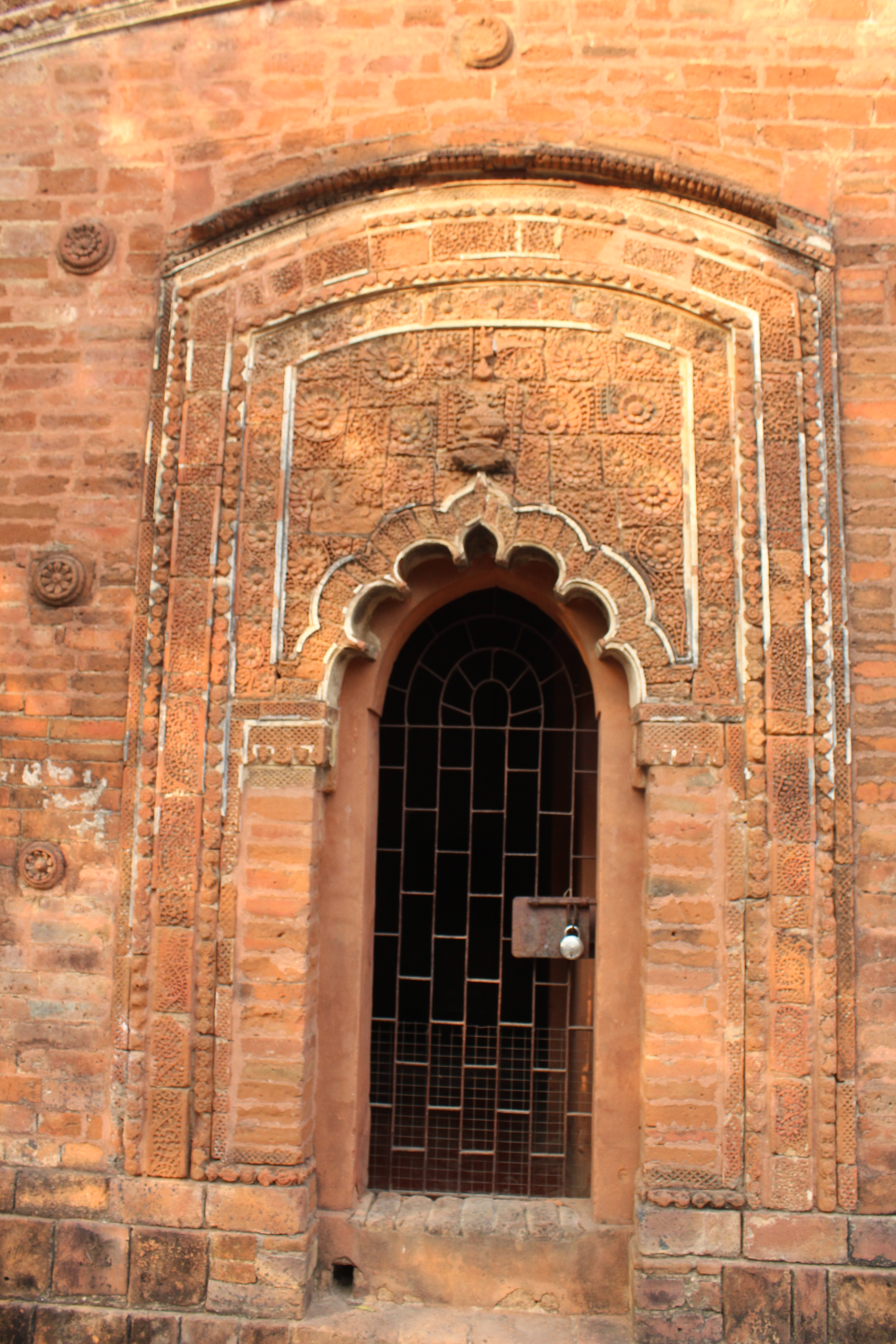

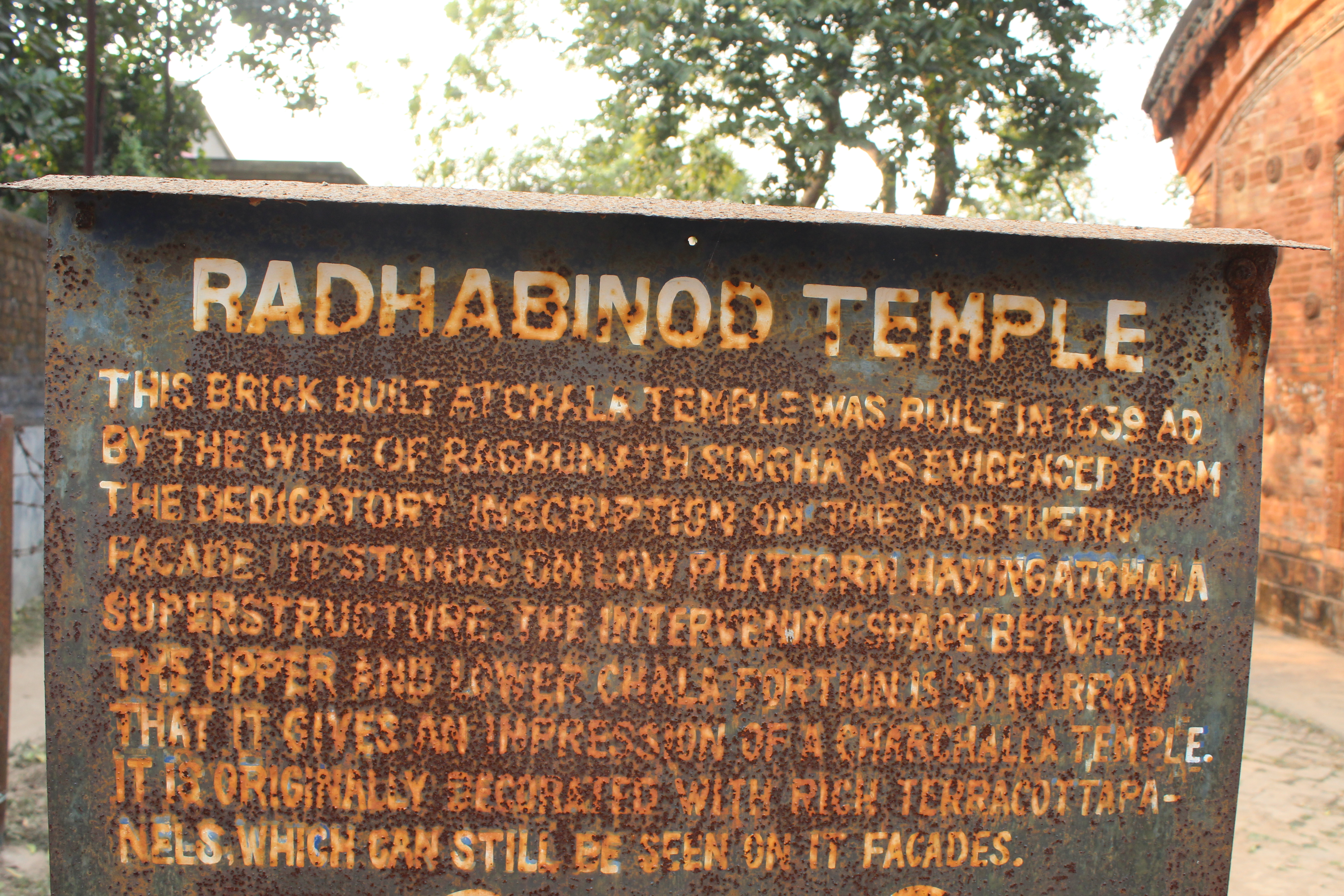

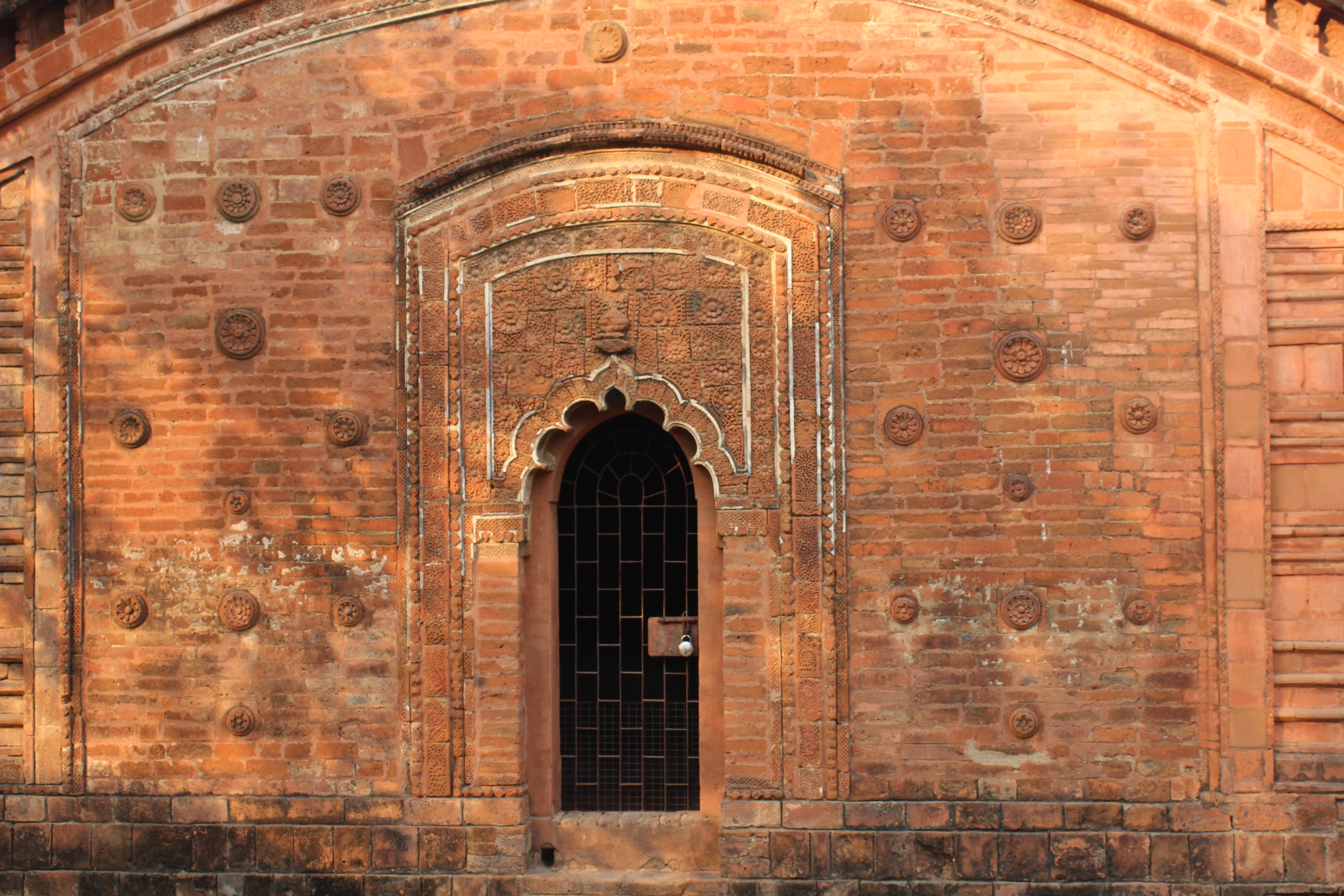

== Sources ==
- Biswas, S. S. (1992). Bishnupur (University of Illinois at Urbana-Champaign ed.). Director General, Archaeological Survey of India.
