= Mrinmoyee Temple =

Coordinates: 23°04′22″N 87°19′33″E

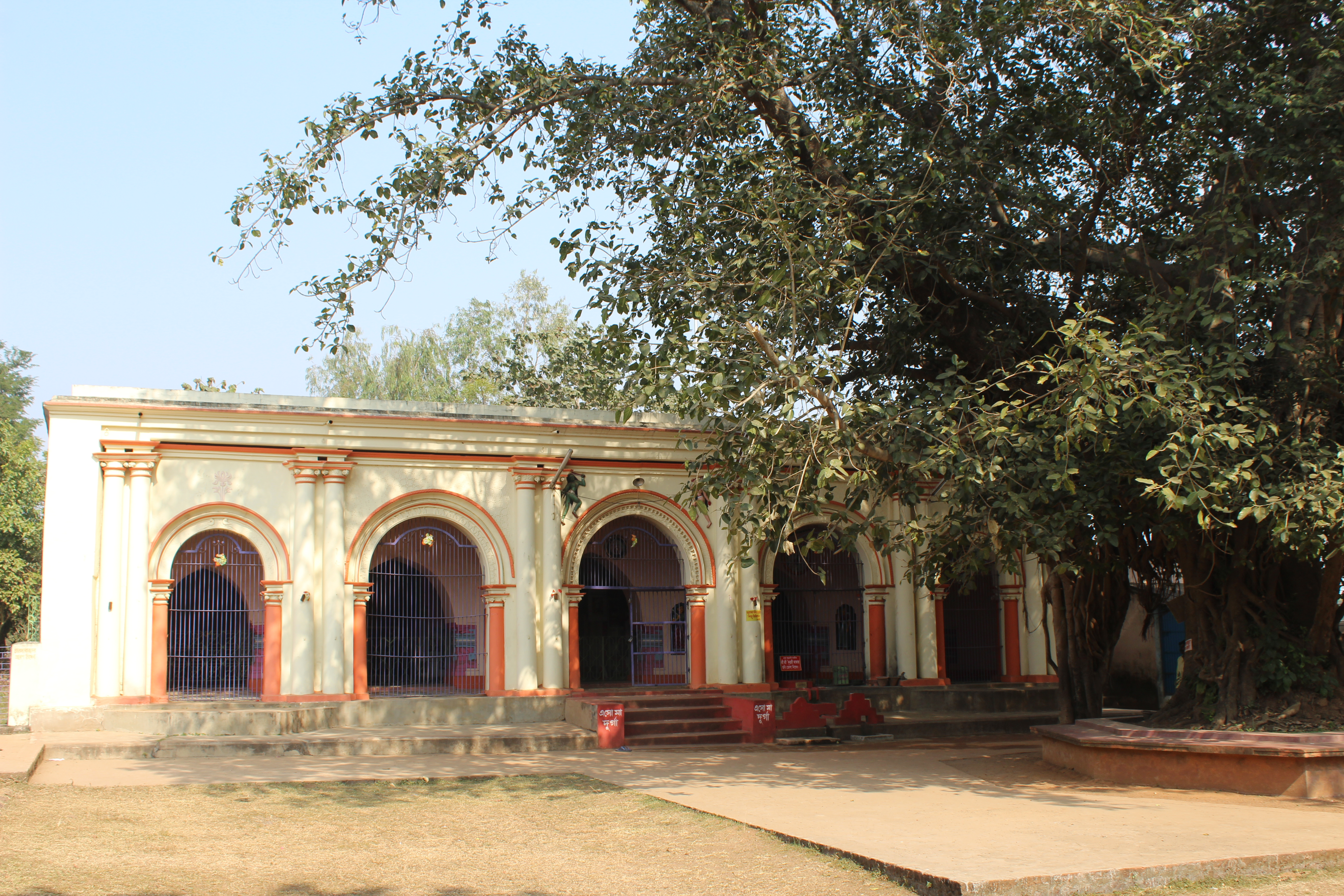

Religion
- Affiliation: Hinduism
- District: Bankura District
- Deity: Durga in the form of Mrinmoyee
- Festival: Durga Puja

Location
- Location: Bishnupur
- State: West Bengal
- Country: India
- Interactive map of Mrinmoyee Temple

Architecture
- Type: Bengal temple architecture
- Style: dalan style
- Founder: Jagat Malla
- Established: 997; 1029 years ago

Mrinmoyee Temple is an ancient temple in the town of Bishnupur in Bankura district of the Indian state of West Bengal. It was founded in the 10th century by the Malla king Jagat Malla.

== History ==
Jagat Malla gets special attention in the history of the Malla dynasty, as it is believed that as per the direction of the Goddess Maa Mrinmoyee, he shifted his capital from Pradyumnapur to Bishnupur and established this clay temple in 997 CE., not far from the palace. The worship of Goddess Durga in the form of Maa Mrinmoyee in the autumn started after the establishment of the temple. That trend continues. Incidentally, Ramakrishna Paramhansa Dev and Maa Sarada Devi visited the Mrinmoyee Temple.

In 2023, the Durga festival of the Mrinmoyee temple in Bishnupur entered its 1027th year. An ancient puja of more than a thousand years. The oldest Durga festival in Bengal. The goddess is worshipped in the name and form of Mrinmoyee. Devi Mrinmoyee is another form of Goddess Durga.
