= Malleswar Temple =

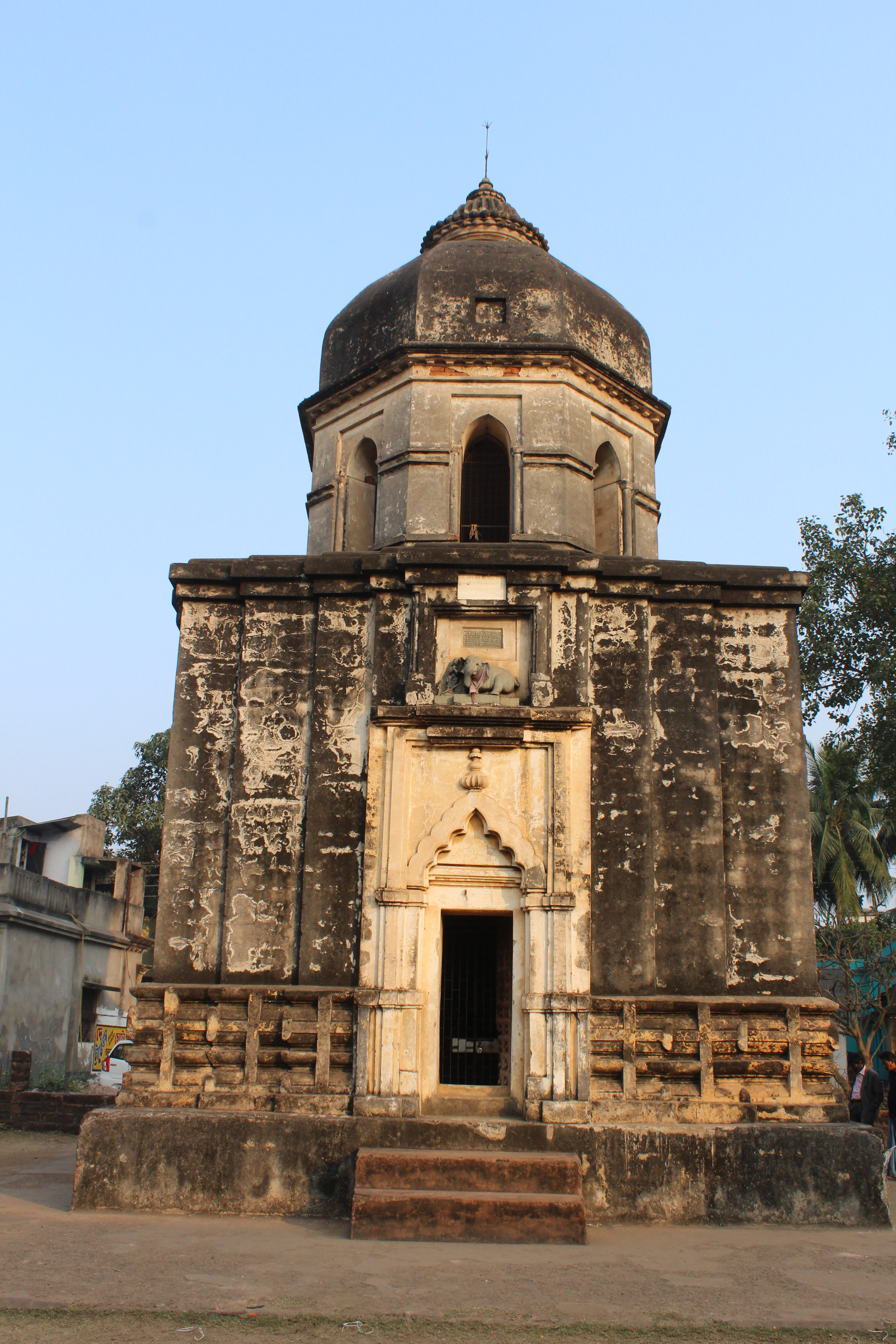

Religion
- Affiliation: Hinduism
- District: Bankura
- Deity: Shiva

Location
- Location: Bishnupur
- State: West Bengal
- Country: India
- Interactive map of Malleswar Temple
- Coordinates: 23°4′47.51″N 87°19′12.66″E

Architecture
- Type: Bengal temple architecture
- Style: deul
- Founder: Bir Singha
- Established: 1622; 404 years ago

Specifications
- Length: 16.9 m (55 ft)
- Width: 16.9 m (55 ft)
- Height (max): 10.7 m (35 ft)
- Monument of National Importance
- Official name: Mallesvara Temple
- Type: Cultural
- Reference no.: IN-WB-16

Malleswar Temple also known as Mallesvara Temple, is a Shiva temple in Bishnupur in Indian state of West Bengal. This temple was dedicated to Shiva.

== History and architecture ==
According to the Inscriptional plaque, the temple was founded in 1622 by King Bir Singha of Mallabhum. The Temple is built in the deul style temple architecture.

The structure's layout is square-shaped, with each side being 6.9 meters wide and 10.7 meters tall. Originally, the temple had a curved tower (rekha sikhara), but this was later replaced by an "octagonal" tower. There are three other temples of the same style, called Krishna-Balarama, Kesara-Raya, and Nikunjabihar temples, but they are now in ruins.

The temple is preserved as one of the archaeological monuments by the Archaeological Survey of India.

== Gallery ==
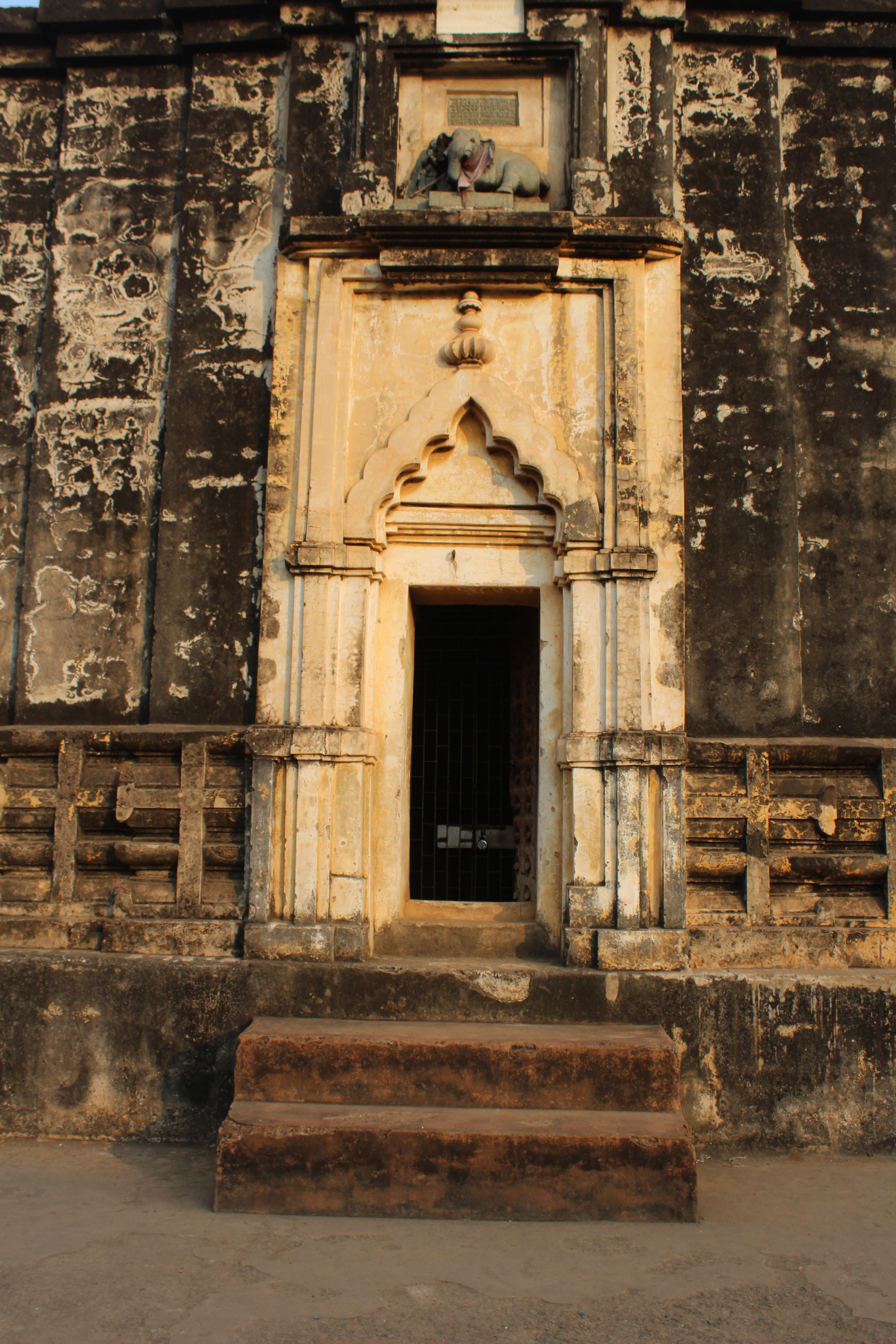

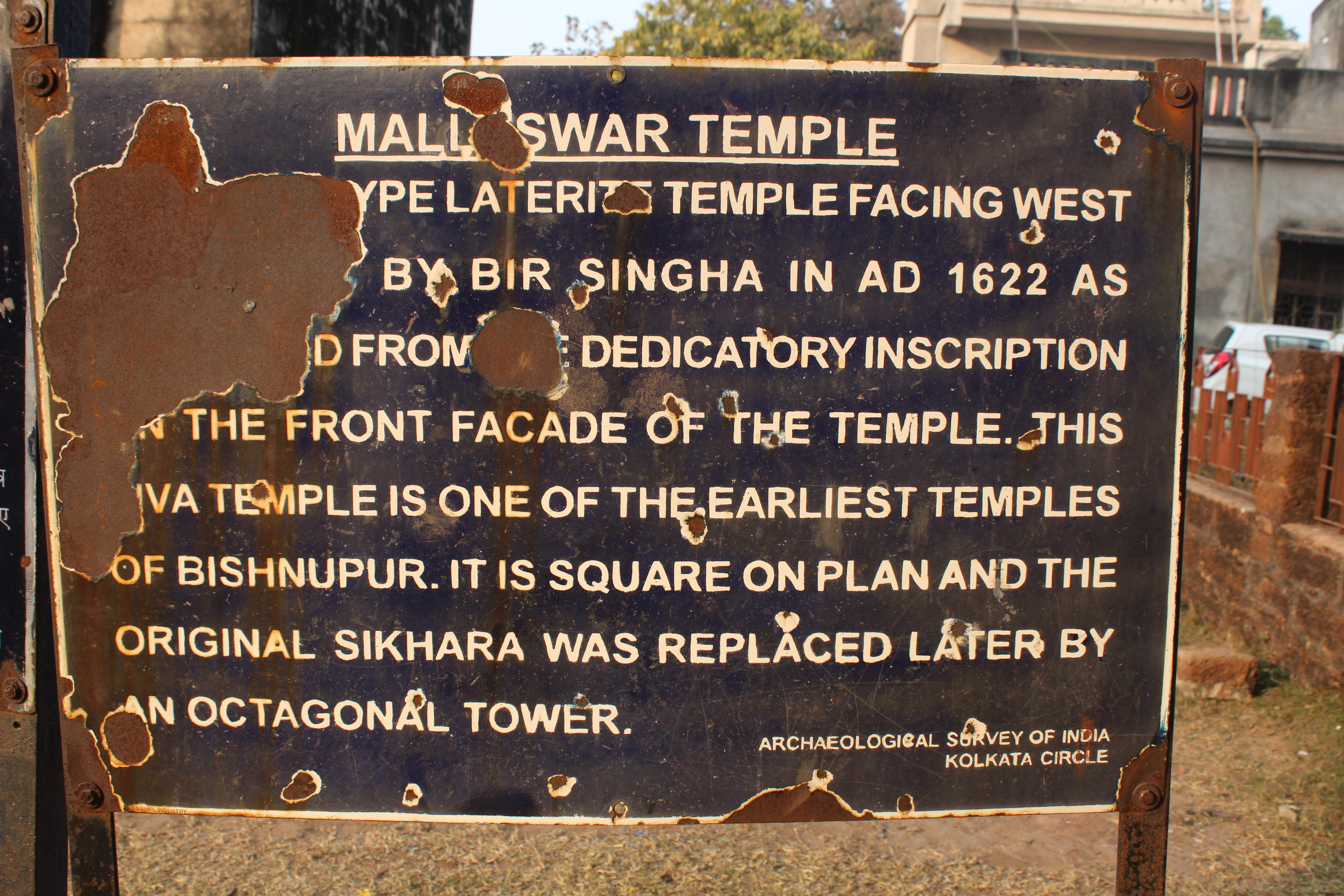

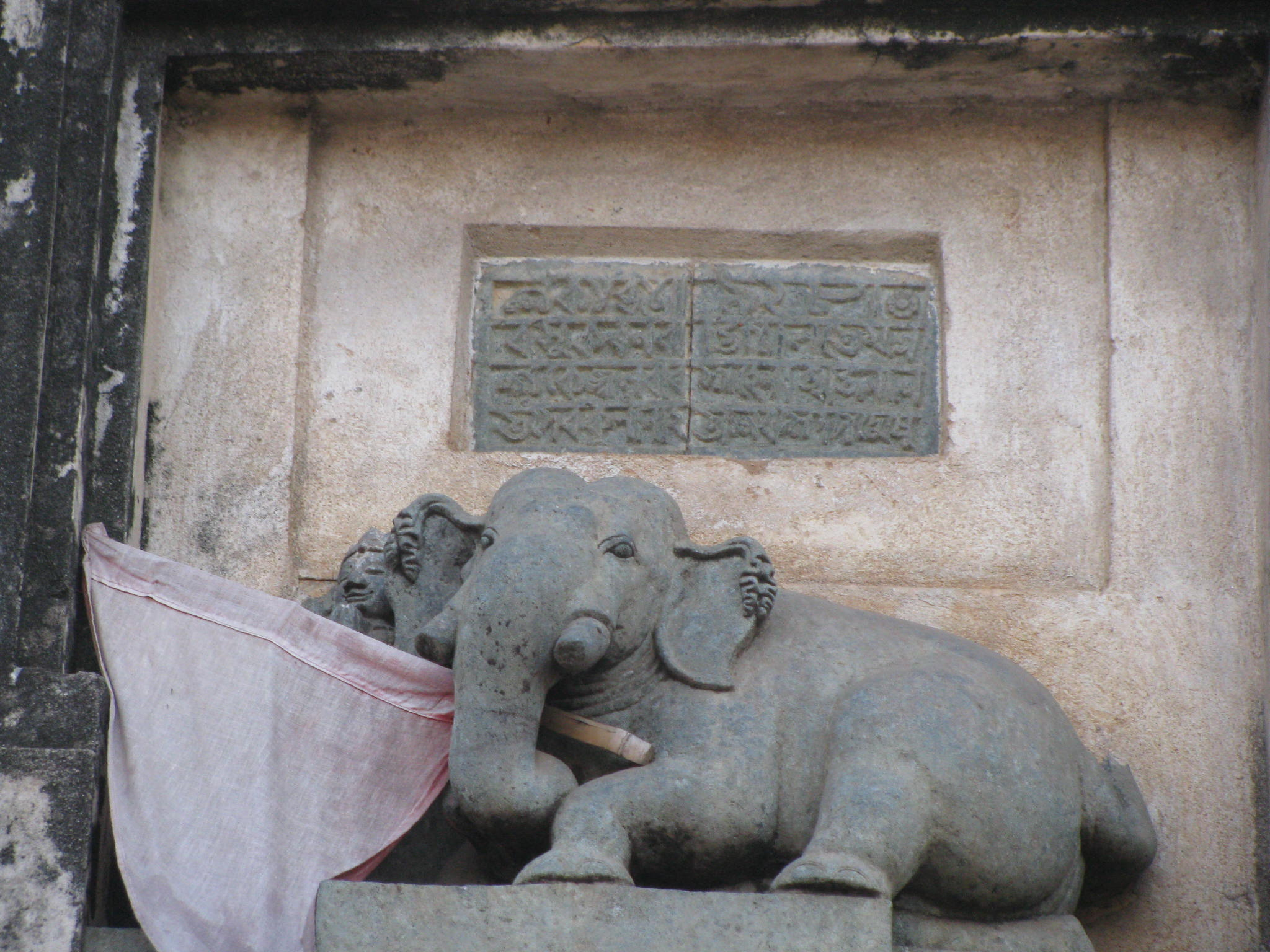

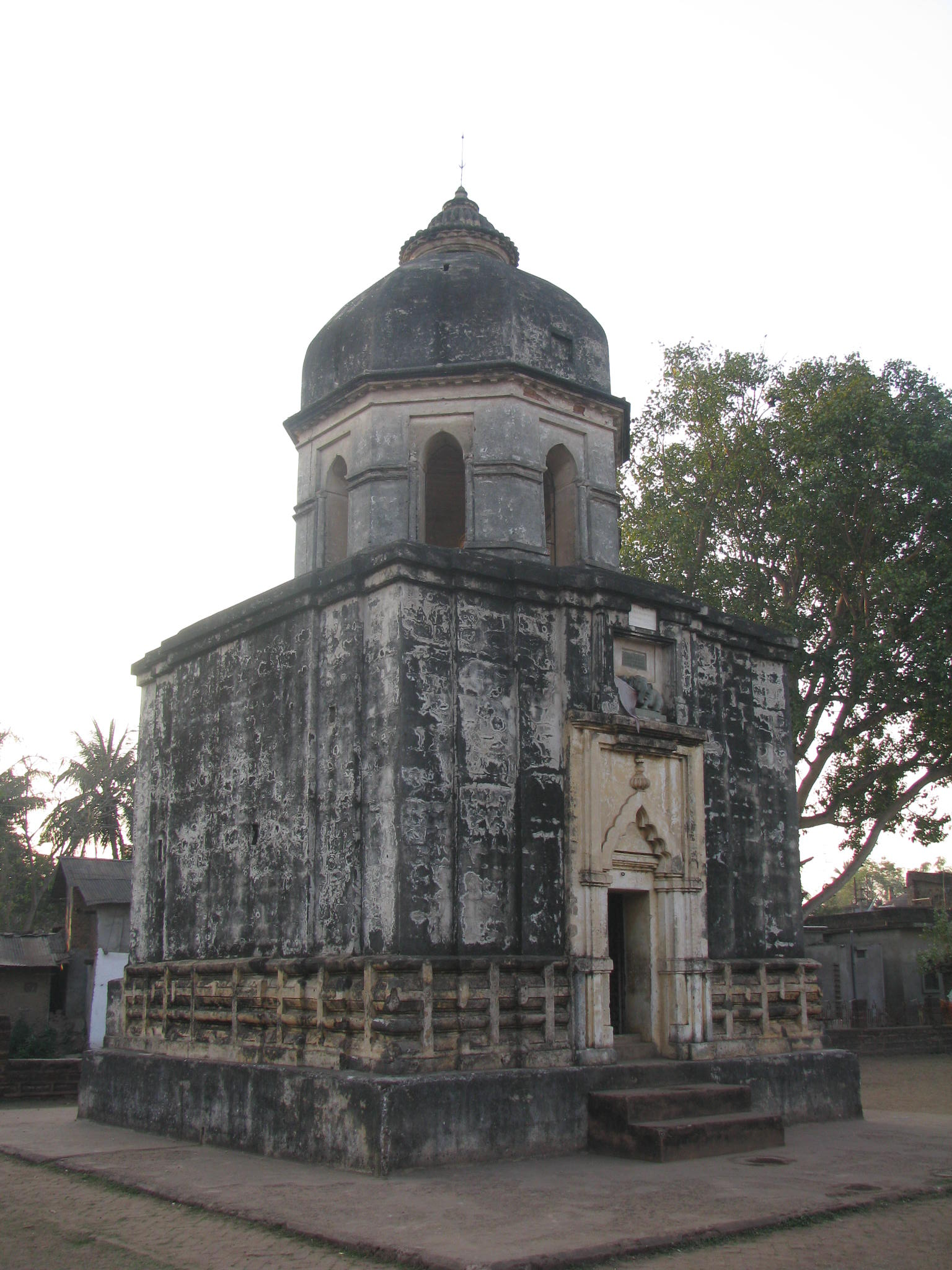

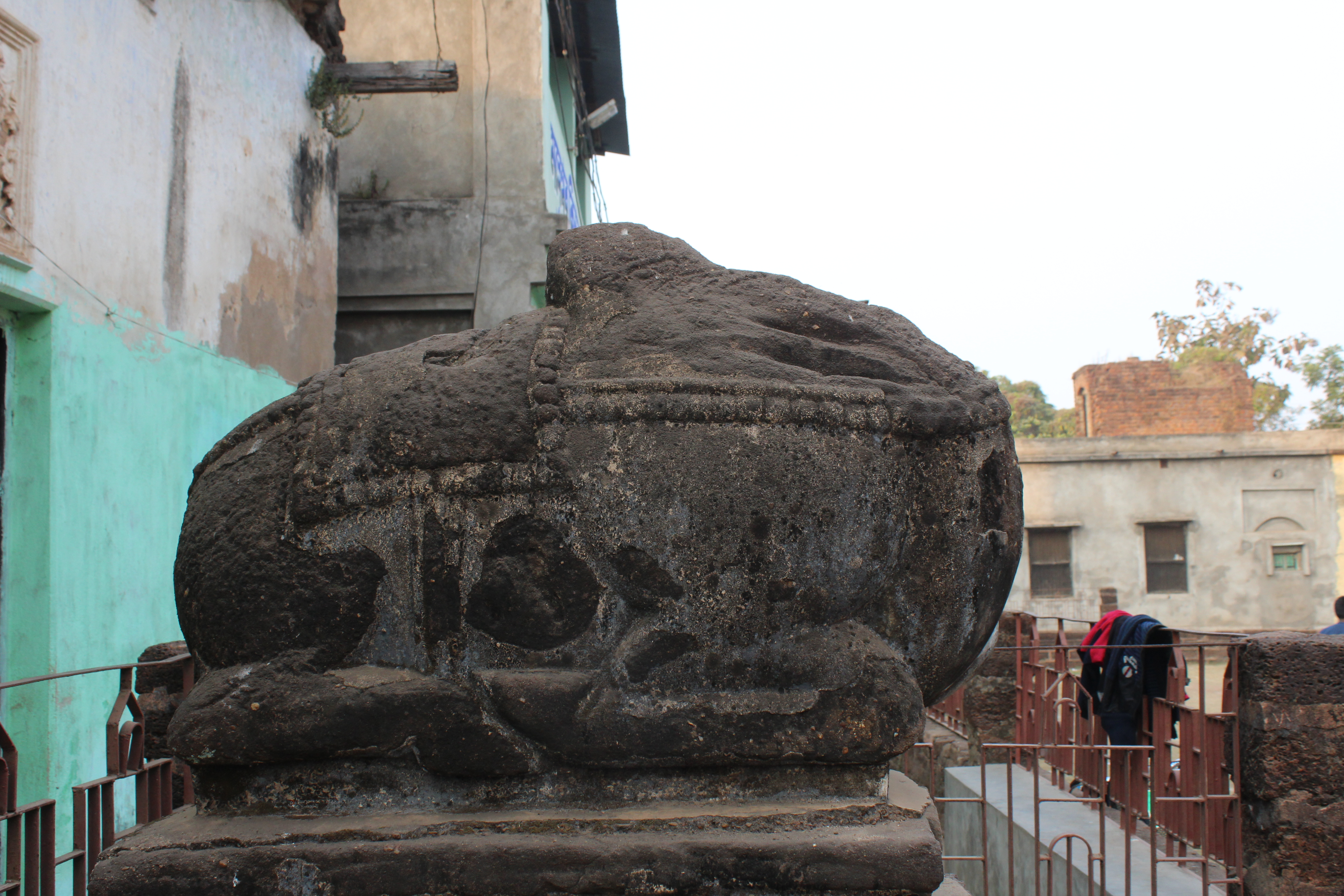

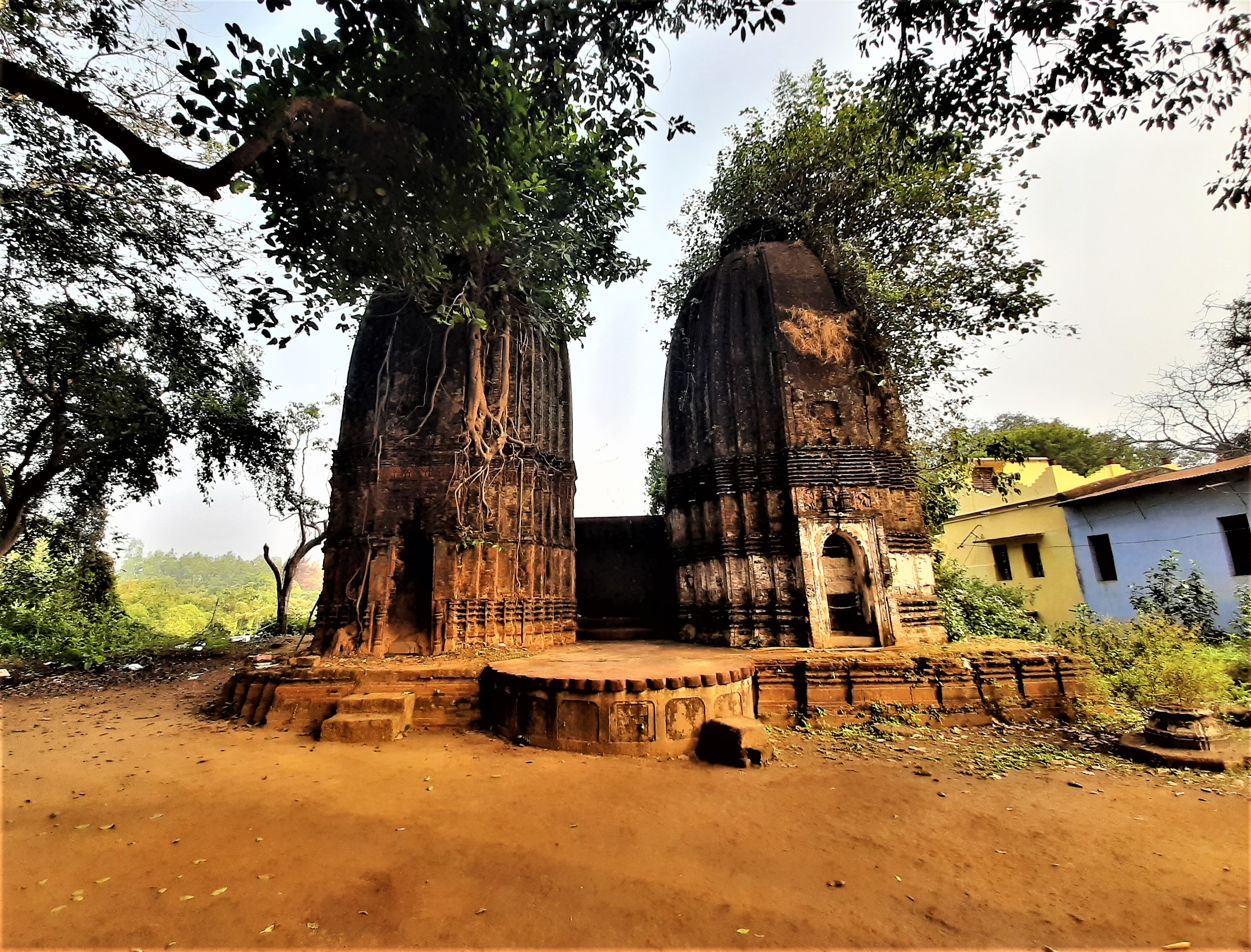
Krishna-Balarama Temple

== Sources ==
- Biswas, S. S. (1992). Bishnupur (University of Illinois at Urbana-Champaign ed.). Director General, Archaeological Survey of India.
