= Sheesh Mahal =

Sheesh Mahal (transl. Palace of Mirrors), also spelt as Shish Mahal, may refer to:

== Architecture ==
- Sheesh Mahal, Amer Fort, in Amer, Rajasthan, India
- Sheesh Mahal (Lahore Fort), in Lahore, Punjab Pakistan
- Sheesh Mahal, located in the Qila Mubarak at Patiala, Punjab, India
- Sheesh Mahal, located in the Qila Mubarak at Faridkot, Punjab, India
- Sheesh Mahal, at Kiratpur Sahib, Punjab, India
- Sheesh Mahal, in the Orchha Fort complex, Orchha, Madhya Pradesh, India
- Sheesh Mahal in Agra Fort, Agra, Uttar Pradesh, India

== Films ==
- Sheesh Mahal (1950 film), 1950 Indian film
- Sheeshmahal, 2024 Indian film

== See also ==
- Shish (disambiguation)
- Shisha (disambiguation)
- Mahal (disambiguation)
- Palace of Mirrors (disambiguation)
- Hall of Mirrors (disambiguation)
