= Palace of Mirrors (disambiguation) =

Palace of Mirrors is the fifth studio album by Estradasphere.

Palace of Mirrors may also refer to:

- Palace of Mirrors, a companion book to Just Ella authored by Margaret Peterson Haddix
- Sheesh Mahal (disambiguation)
  - Sheesh Mahal (Lahore Fort), a UNESCO World Heritage Site in Lahore Fort built during the reign of Mughal Emperor Shah Jahan in 1631–32
