= Shish =

Shish may refer to:

- SHISH, the Albanian intelligence service

== Food ==
Shish is a Turkish word meaning skewer, and many meat dishes accordingly have the word in their name.

- Shish kebab
- Shish taouk
- Shish taouk (Montreal).

== People ==
- Gal Shish, Israeli footballer
- Vasily Shish, Belarusian kickboxer
- Hairy Moccasin (Crow: Esh-sup-pee-me-shish), a Crow scout for George Armstrong Custer

== Places ==
- Shish Deh, a city in Iran
- Shish River in Omsk Oblast, Russia
- Sheesh Mahal (Lahore), a fort built by Mughal emperor Shah Jahan
- Other buildings also called Sheesh Mahal

== Popular culture ==
- Shish Boom Bam, a 1994 album by the Rustic Overtones
- A misunderstanding of the dog breed Shih Tzu

== See also ==
- Shisha (disambiguation)
