= Naulakha Pavilion =

World Heritage Site in Pakistan

- نولکھا
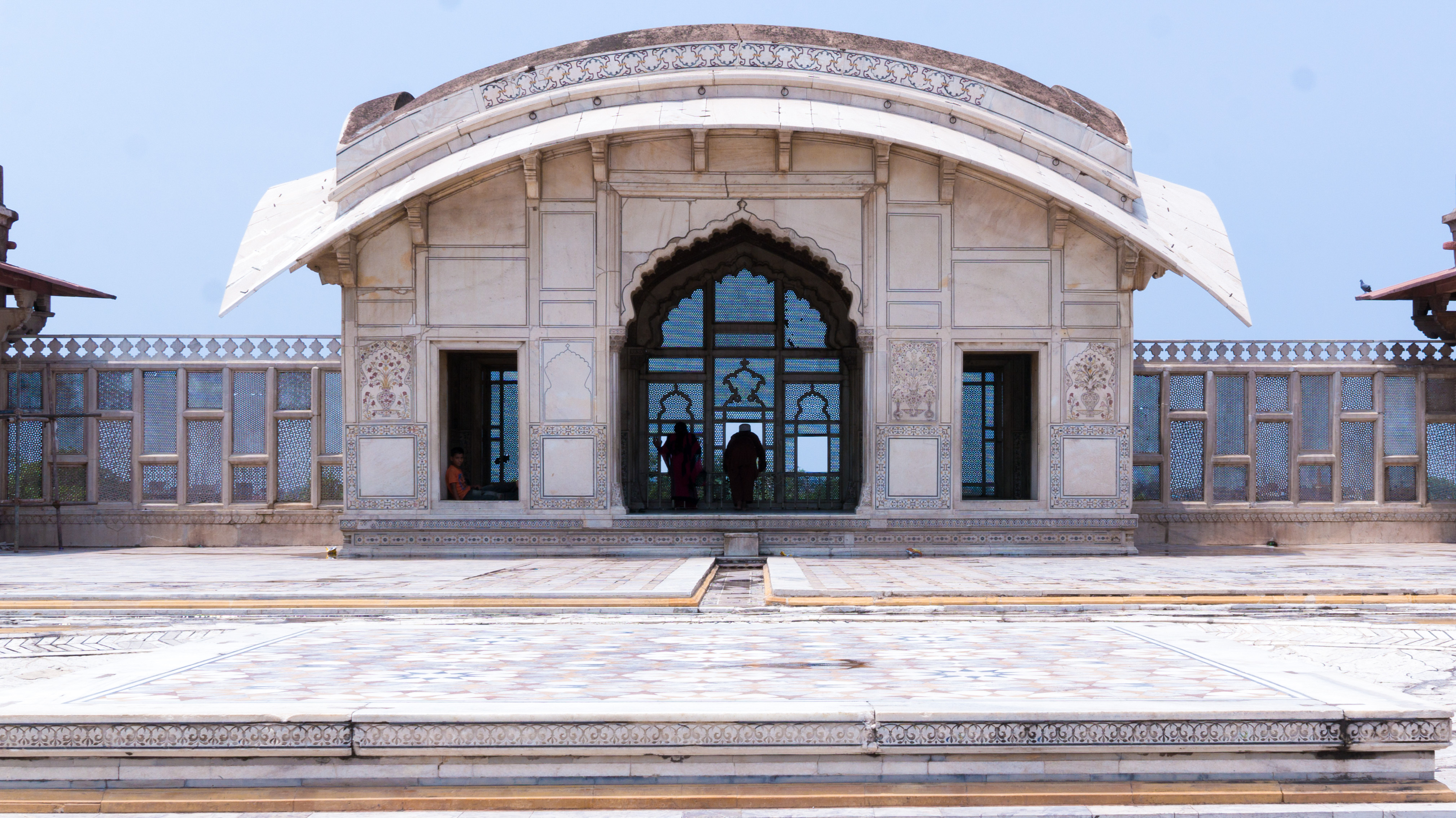

General information
- Type: Public monument
- Architectural style: Mughal
- Location: Lahore, Punjab (Pakistan)
- Coordinates: 31°35′23″N 74°18′47″E
- Construction started: 1631
- Completed: 1633

Design and construction
- Architect: Wazir Khan (Lahore)
- Civil engineer: Abd al-Karim

The Naulakha Pavilion (Urdu: نولکھا) is a white marble personal chamber with a curvilinear roof, located beside the Sheesh Mahal courtyard, in the northern section of the Lahore Fort in Lahore, Pakistan. The monument is one of the 21 monuments situated within the Lahore Fort, with its western façade providing a panoramic view of the old city of Lahore.

The structure was originally inlaid with precious and semi-precious stones and overlooked the Ravi River. In 1981, as part of the larger Lahore Fort Complex, Naulakha was a UNESCO World Heritage Site. The pavilion is now one of Lahore's most recognizable sights, and has influenced architectural design of notable buildings, including the Pakistani embassy in Washington, D.C.

== Etymology ==
When the pavilion was built in 1633 by the Mughal emperor Shah Jahan as a small summer house, it cost around 900,000 rupees, an exorbitant amount at the time. It is called Naulakha because in Urdu language, the word means 'worth 9 lakhs rupees'. This also brought the word Naulakha into common use to signify something precious.

== History ==
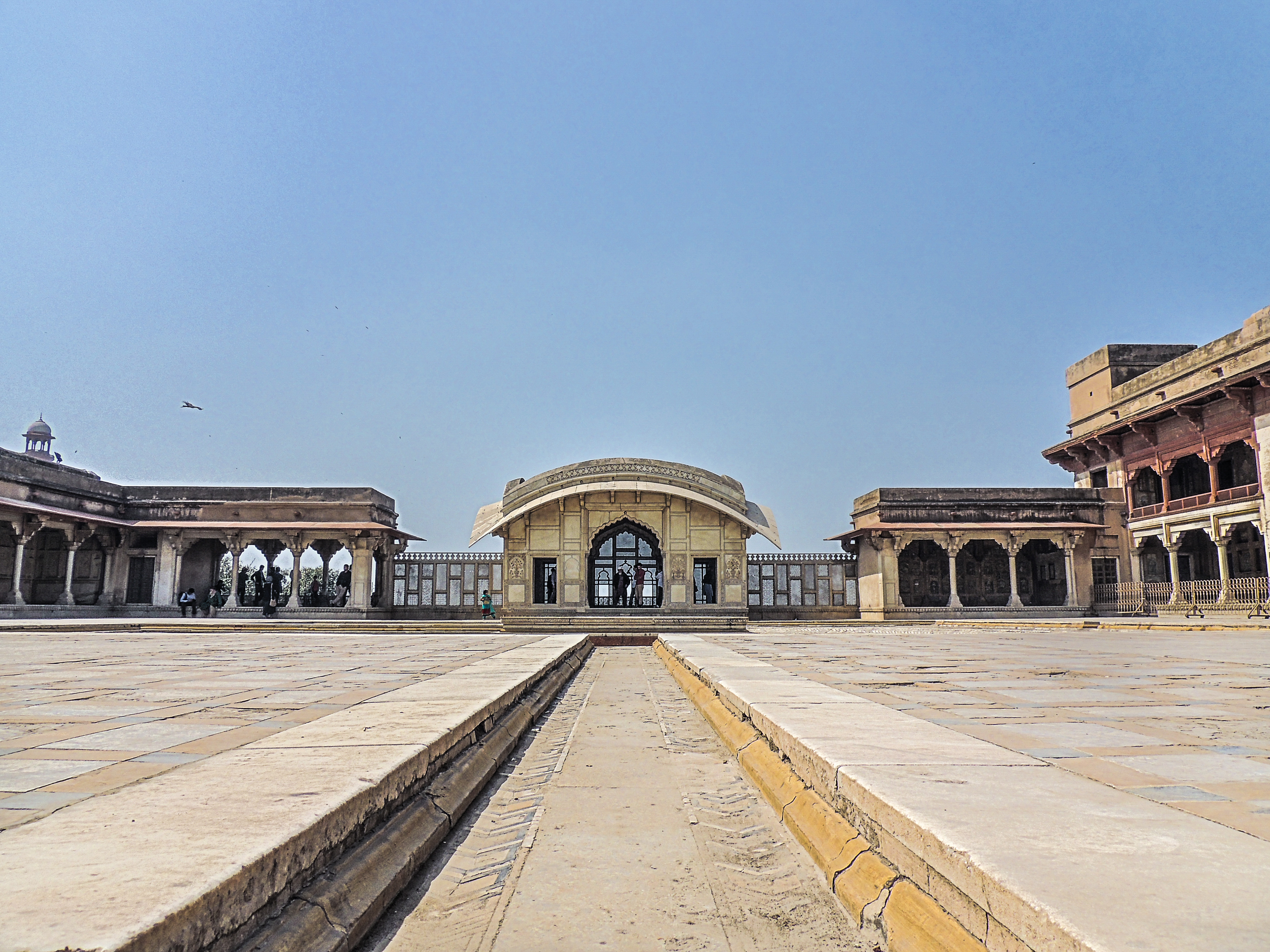
The pavilion is adjacent to the Sheesh Mahal in the Shah Burj Quadrangle of the Lahore Fort.

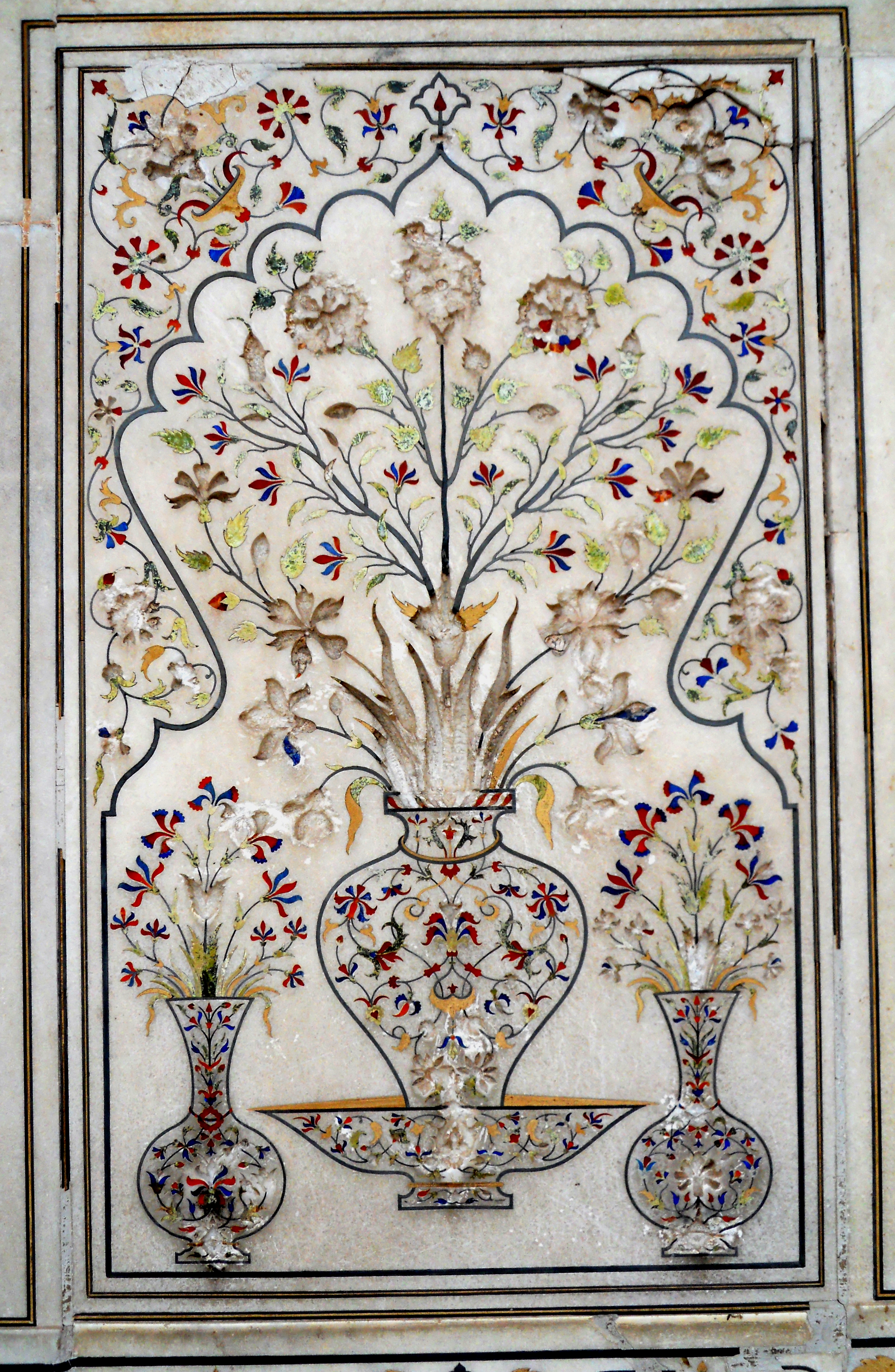
Pietra dura detail.

The Lahore Fort was built in 1566 under the rule of Mughal emperor Akbar the Great on the location of an earlier mud-fort. The solid brick masonry complex was later extended and modified by subsequent emperors. Mughal emperor Shah Jahan was a romantic man who constructed Taj Mahal in Agra and after that this master piece in Lahore was built in 1633 as a small summer house costing around 900,000 rupees - an exorbitant amount at the time. Naulakha Pavilion is among the buildings that were erected or reconstructed between 1628 and 1634 under Shah Jahan's rule. Due to his personal interest in the design and construction, Shah Jahan's architectural traditions manifest distinctive symmetry and hierarchical accents. Naulakha Pavilion is part of the Shah Burj block in the northwest section of the fort that was actually built by his predecessor Jahangir.

In 1927, the building was listed by the Department of Archaeology of British India. In 1975, it was listed as a protected monument under the Antiquities Act by Pakistan's Department of Archaeology, whereas in 1981, as part of the larger Lahore Fort Complex, it became inscribed as a UNESCO World Heritage Site.

More recently, the building and its materials have started showing signs of damage and discolouration due to the air pollution. The pollutants such as sulphur dioxide and other emissions, have already affected the white marble of the nearby Sheesh Mahal in the Lahore Fort Complex.

== Design ==
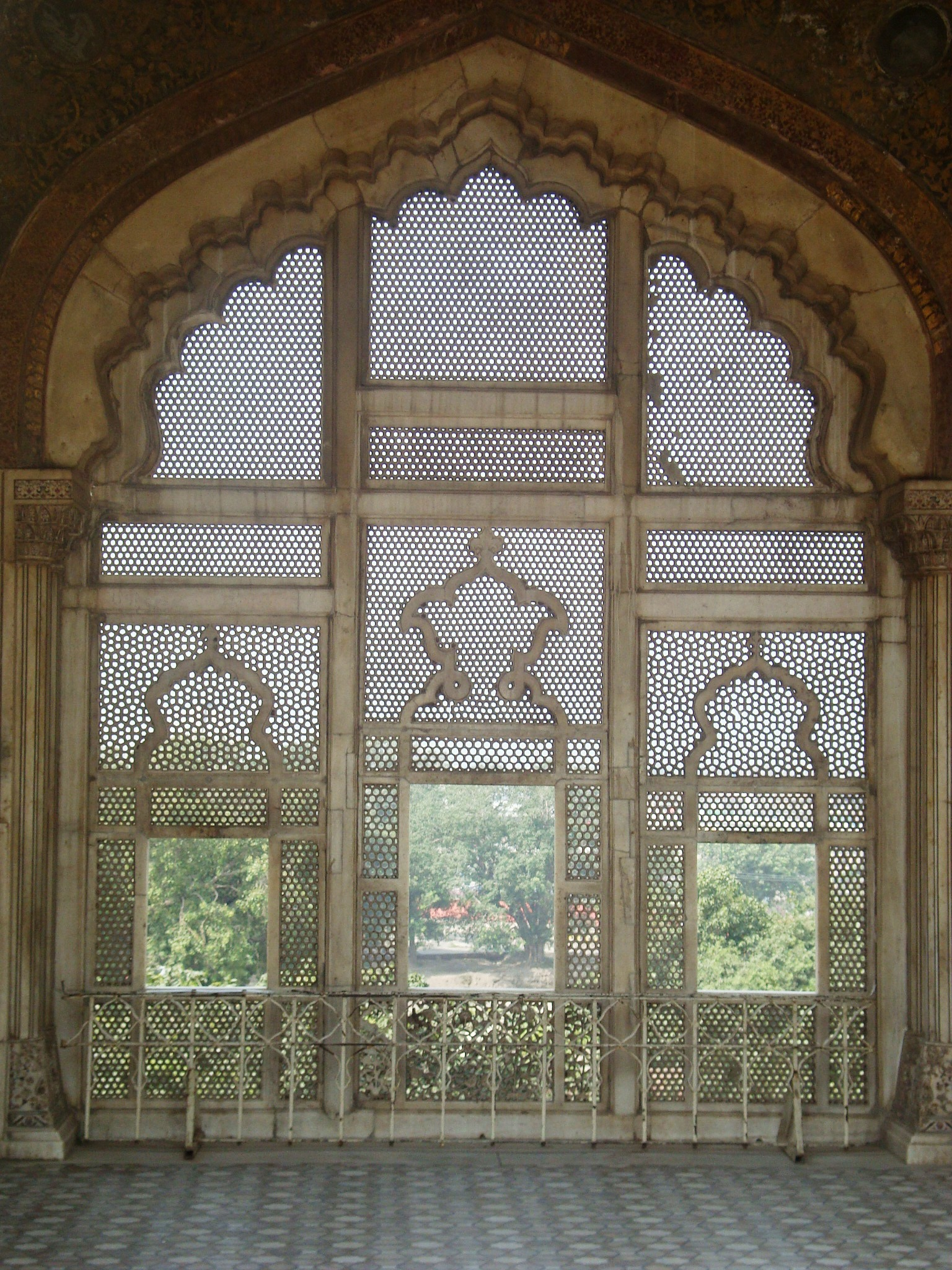
The pavilion features a carved marble screen.

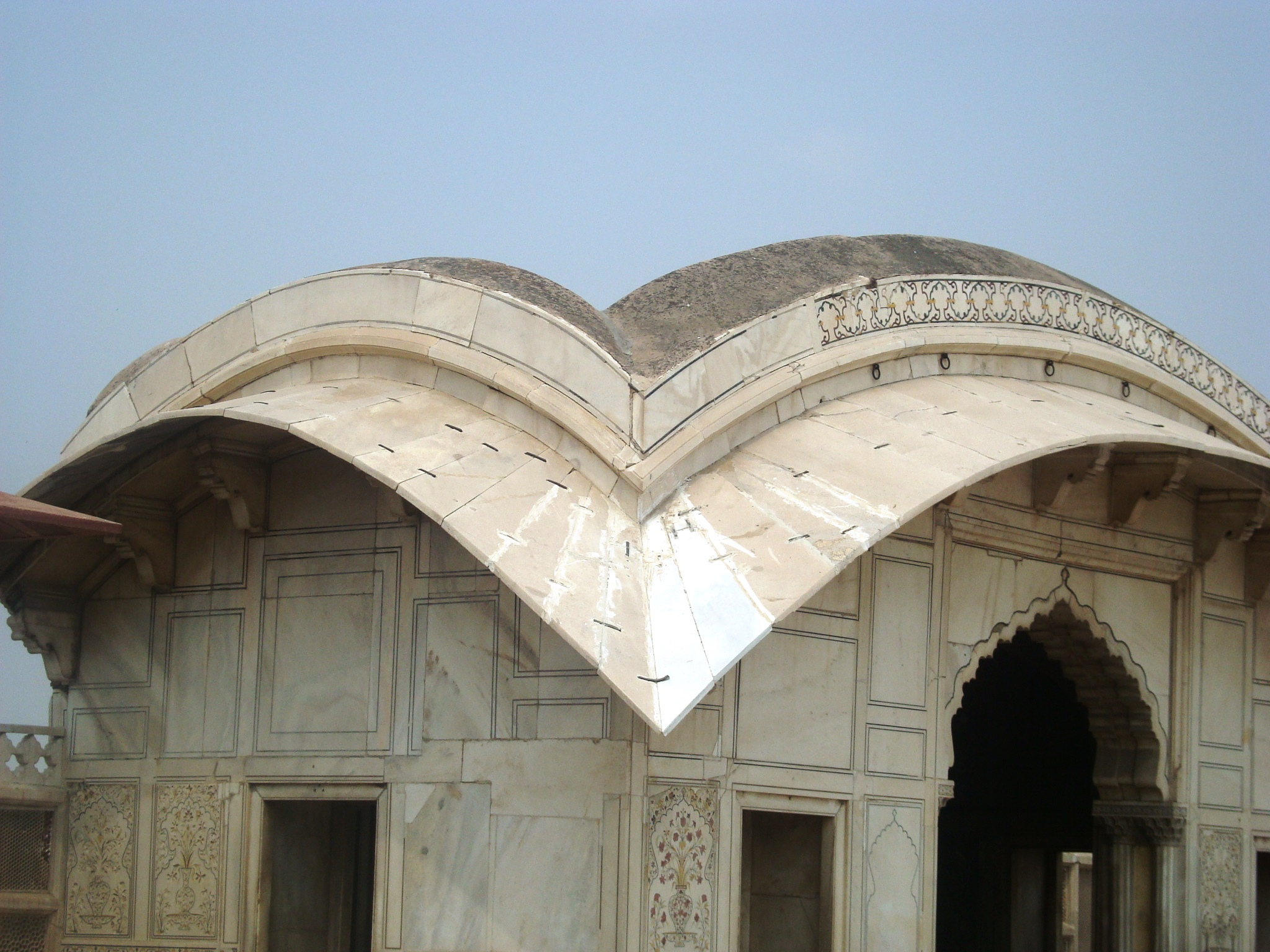
Naulakha Pavilion is known for its distinctive Bengali Do-chala style curvilinear roof.

The pavilion is rectangular in shape, situated in the west of Sheesh Mahal, and is prominent because of its centrally arched and extraordinarily curved roof typical of Bengal’s Do-chala style. This unique feature is symbolic of Shajahani architecture. It reflects a mixture of contemporary traditions (at the time of its construction) of sloping-roof from Bengal, and Baldachin from Europe. This demonstrates the imperial as well as religious image of the subject. The original roof was probably gilded. The inner walls are minutely inlaid with precious and semi-precious stones and silver with delicate parchin kari ornamentation are considered among the finest in the world. Glazed tile mosaics have been used to decorate the spandrels of the arched openings with floral designs and images of angels, genies, and solomonic symbols. The marble screens of the pavilion are crowned with merlons to prevent inmates being seen from the grounds in between the Fort and the river. The overall quadrangle comprises private quarters for royal family and closely resembles Agra fort.

== Influence ==
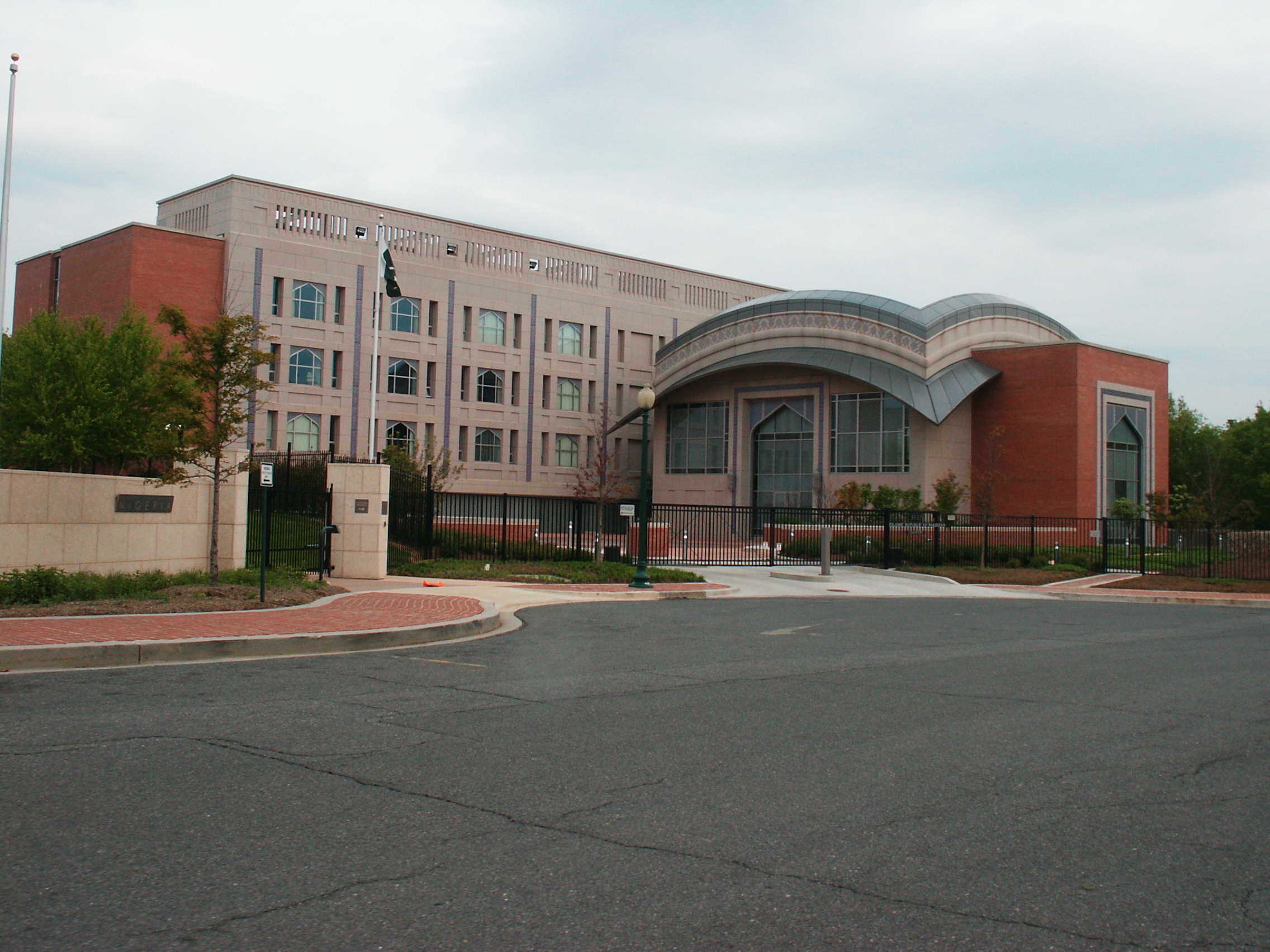
The architectural style of the Pakistani embassy in Washington, D.C. is inspired by the Naulakha Pavilion.

As a unique and impressive monument of Mughal architecture, the building became a source of inspiration to Rudyard Kipling during his early days in Lahore. One of his novels is titled The Naulahka (sic), written in collaboration with Wolcott Balestier, the brother of his then-fiancée Caroline. The novel is about a precious necklace, which is called the Naulahka. When Kipling settled in his house in Dummerston, Vermont, he named it Naulakha, after the pavilion. To him, Naulakha symbolised the virtues, tranquilityfulness, and solitude of the rural Vermont.

== Numismatics ==
The Naulakha Pavilion motif was used on the reverse of the Pakistani one rupee banknote, issued by the Government of Pakistan in 1964. The motif was subsequently replaced with the Tomb of Muhammad Iqbal in 1980s, until the one rupee Banknote was taken out of circulation in 2005. The Pakistan Embassy building in Washington D.C. is partly modelled on the Naulakha Pavilion.

== Gallery ==
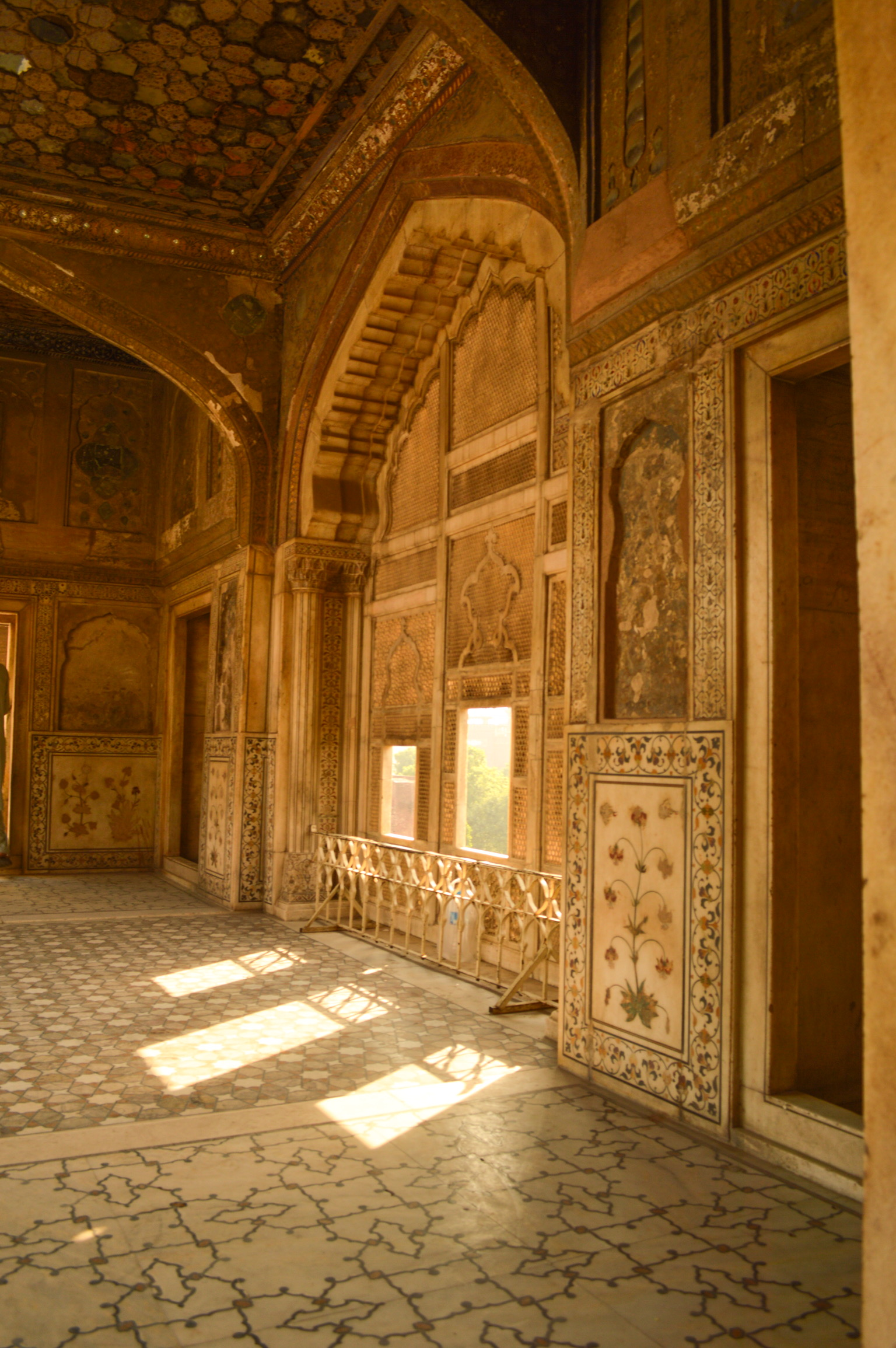
Interior of the pavilion

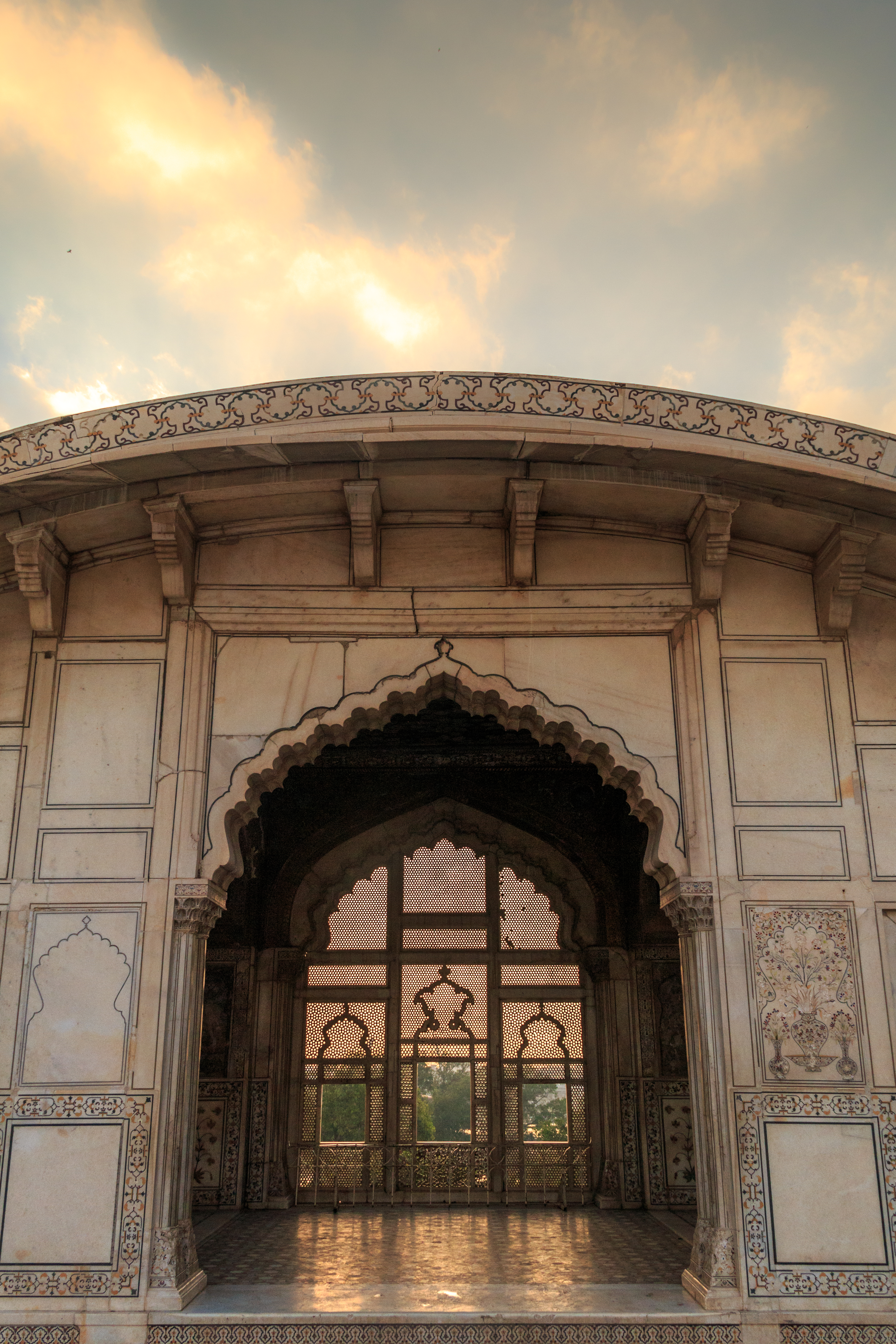
A view at sunset of the pavilions carved marble screens

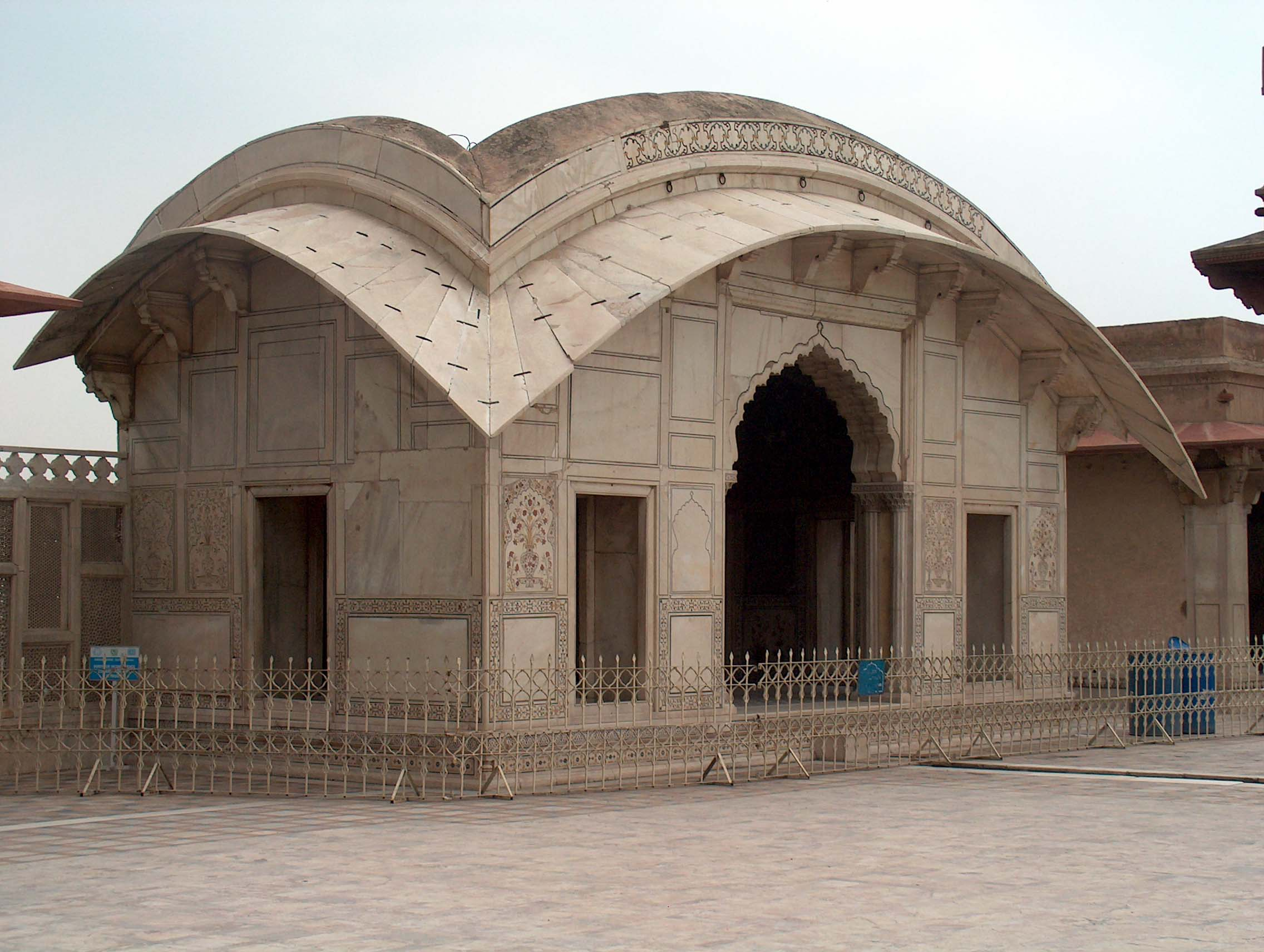
Side-view of the pavilion

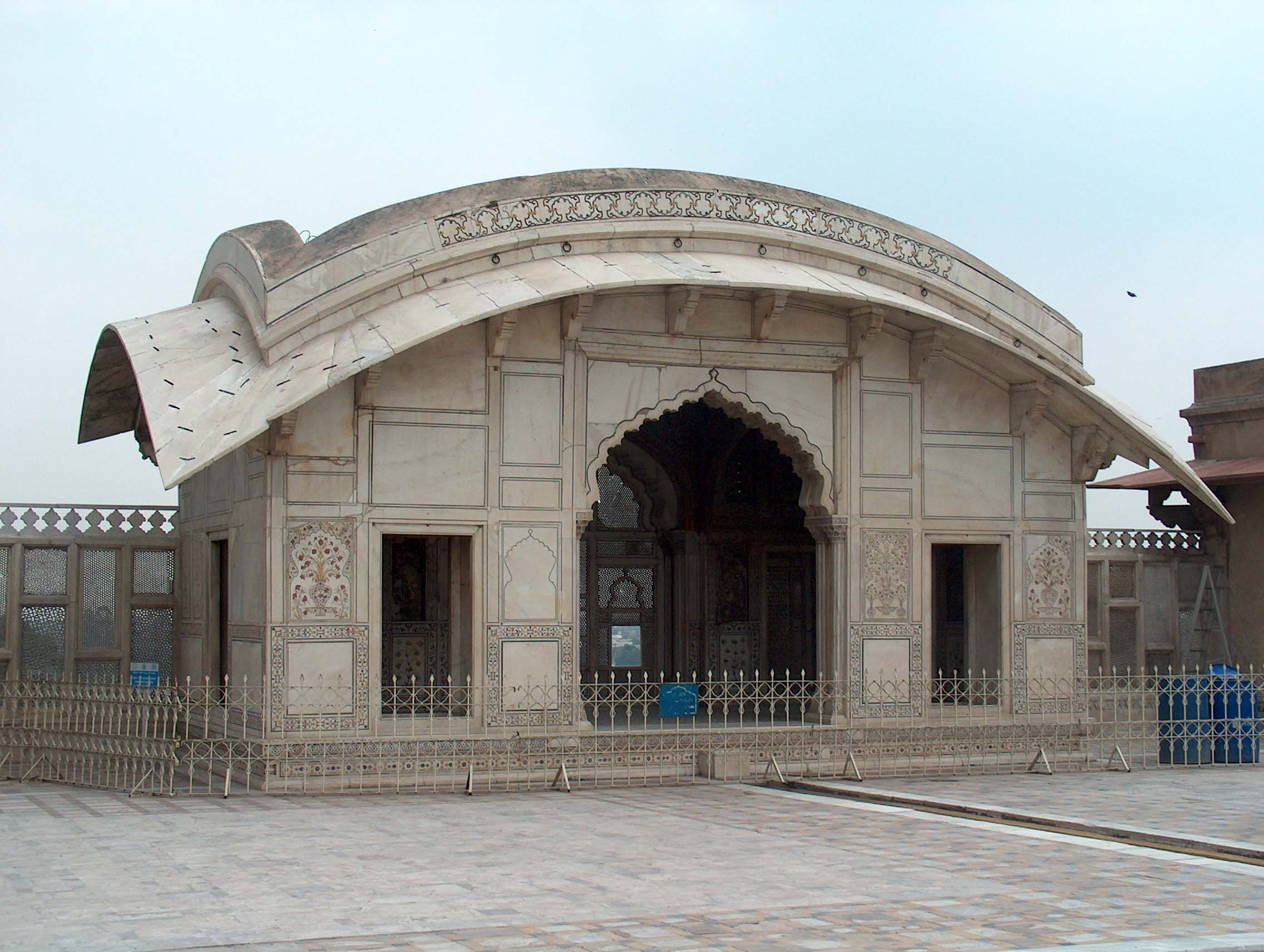
Close-up view

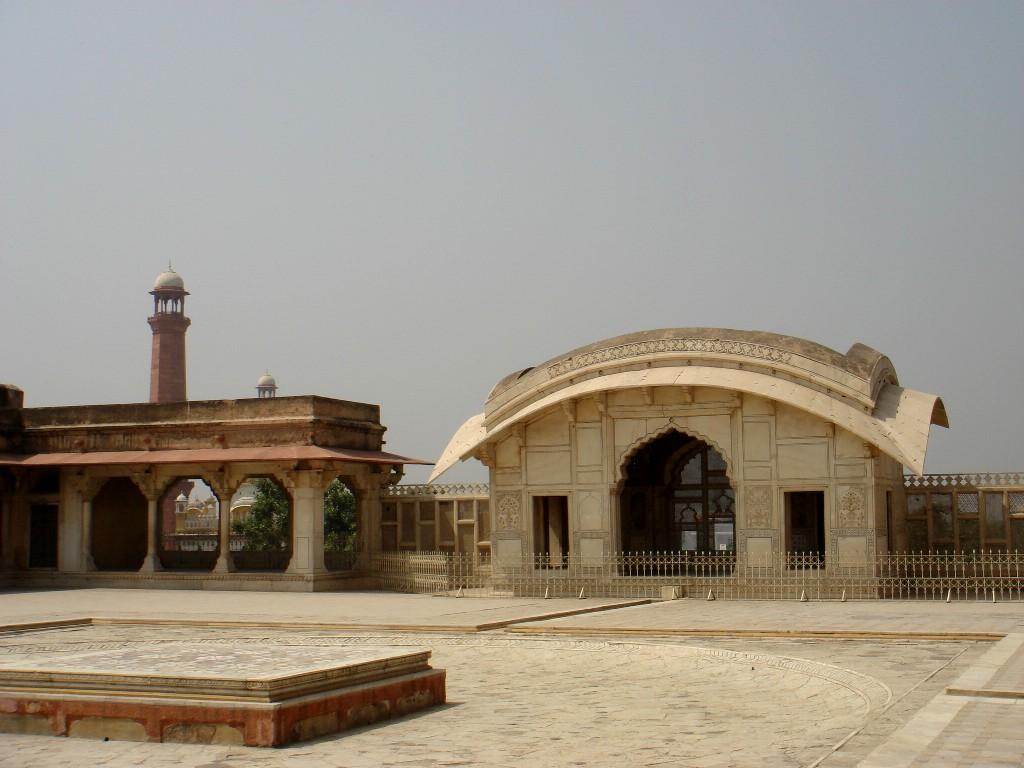
Wider view of the quadrangle, minarets of Badshahi Mosque visible in background

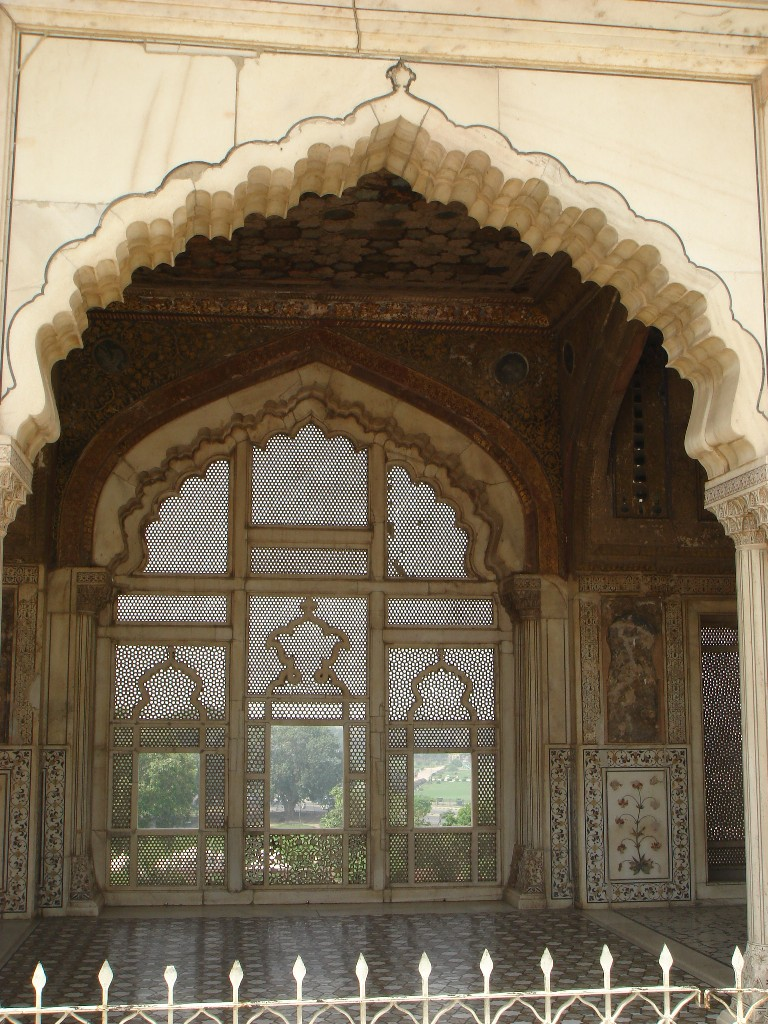
Inner details

== See also ==
- Lahore Fort
- Walled City of Lahore
- Badshahi Mosque
- Shalimar Gardens
- Naulakha Bazaar
