= Hall of Mirrors (disambiguation) =

The Hall of Mirrors is the central gallery of the Palace of Versailles

Hall of Mirrors may also refer to:

== Places ==
- Hall of Mirrors, a hall in Golestan Palace
- House of mirrors or hall of mirrors, a room full of mirrors often found as an attraction at carnivals or amusement parks
- Ossian's Hall of Mirrors, a shrine and view-house in Scotland
- Bonnington Pavilion, the ruined hall of mirrors at Corra Linn waterfall, near New Lanark
- Sheesh Mahal (disambiguation)

== Arts, entertainment, and media ==
- Hall of Mirrors (film), a 2001 independent feature written and directed by Brad Osborne
- "Hall of Mirrors", a song by Kraftwerk from their 1977 album Trans-Europe Express
- "Hall of Mirrors", a song by The Distillers from their 2003 album Coral Fang
- "Hall of Mirrors", a song by Amall Mallick from the 2021 Indian film Saina
- A Hall of Mirrors, a 1964 book written by Robert Stone
- "Hall of Mirrors", a short story by Kurt Vonnegut in the collection Look at the Birdie (2009)
- "Hall of Mirrors", a short story of Amber by Roger Zelazny (1996)
- "Hall of Mirrors", a song by Siouxsie and the Banshees from their 1987 album Through the Looking Glass

== Other uses ==
- Hall of mirrors effect, a visual anomaly in computer graphics
