= Shisha =

Shisha, sheesha, or Shisheh may refer to:

- Mu‘assel or shisha tobacco, the molasses-based tobacco product heated in a hookah
- Hookah lounge, or shisha bar
- Hookah also known as waterpipe, the heated tobacco product or the device used to smoke it

== Other uses ==
- Sheesha (1986 film), directed by Basu Chatterji
- Sheesha (2005 film), a film directed by Ashu Trikha
- "Shisha" (song), a song by Massari
- Taivoan people, also Shisha, a Taiwanese indigenous people
- Shisha (embroidery), or mirror-work, an embroidery technique used to attach small mirrors to cloth
- Sheesha Gumbad, a tomb in Lodhi Gardens, Delhi, India
- Sisa (drug), a psychoactive drug also sometimes spelled "shisha"

== See also ==
- Shisa, a type of Japanese statue derived from Chinese guardian lions
- Shish (disambiguation)
- "Sheesha-E-Dil Na Itna Uchhalo", a song by Lata Mangeshkar from the 1960 Indian film Dil Apna Aur Preet Parai
