= Sheesh Mahal (Lahore Fort) =

- شیش محل
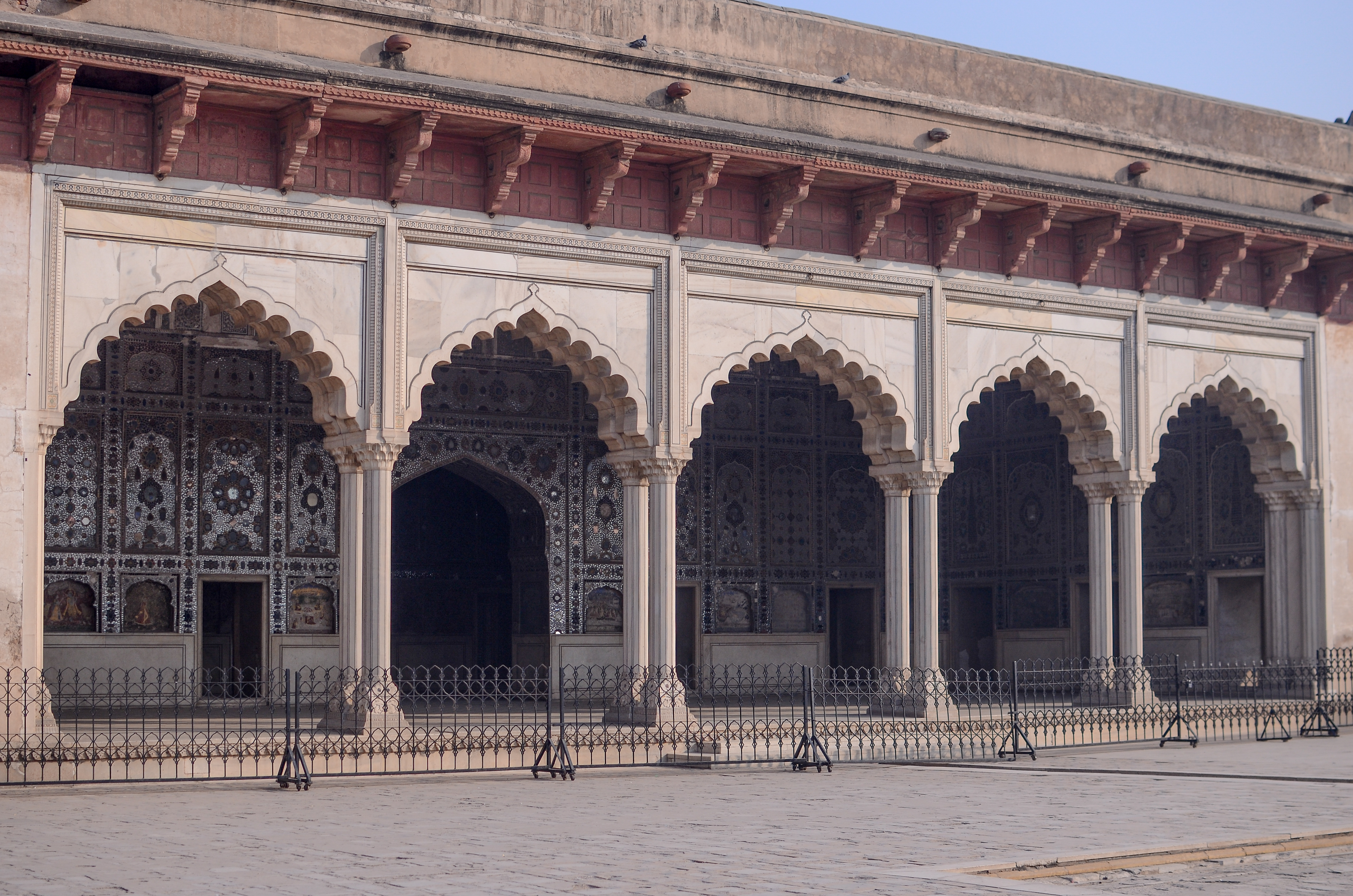
- Interactive map of the Sheesh Mahal area

General information
- Type: Public monument
- Architectural style: Mughal
- Location: Lahore, Punjab Pakistan
- Coordinates: 31°35′23″N 74°18′47″E
- Construction started: 1631
- Completed: 1632; 394 years ago

Design and construction
- Architect: Asif Khan

The Sheesh Mahal (Urdu: شیش محل; "The Palace of Mirrors") is a palace located within the Shah Burj block at the north-western corner of the Lahore Fort, in Lahore, Pakistan. It was constructed during the reign of Mughal Emperor Shah Jahan in 1631–32, with later additions made under Sikh ruler Ranjit Singh. The ornate white marble pavilion is inlaid with pietra dura and intricate mirror work of the finest quality. The hall was reserved for personal use of the imperial family and their close aides. It is among the 21 monuments that were built by successive Mughal emperors inside Lahore Fort, and forms the "jewel in the Fort’s crown." As part of the larger Lahore Fort Complex, it has been inscribed as a UNESCO World Heritage Site since 1981.

== Etymology ==
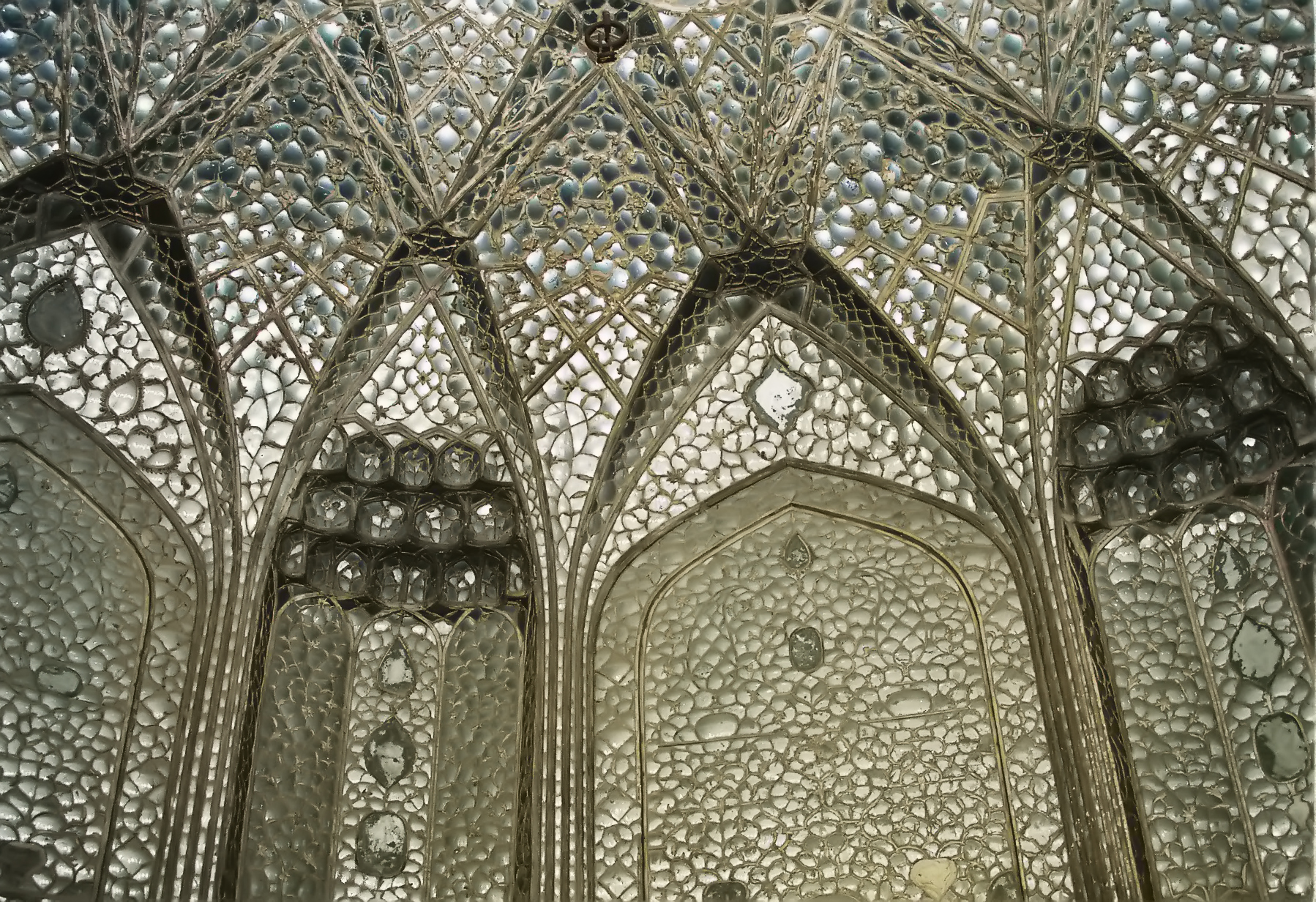
Sheesh Mahal, or "Palace of Mirrors," takes its name from the reflective glass tiles which embellish the interior.

Sheesh Mahal, in Urdu language, literally means 'Crystal Palace'. However, with its pietra dura decorations and intricate mirror-work inlaid into the white marble walls and ceilings creating gleaming effect, the lavish room has come to be known as 'Palace of Mirrors', and sometimes the 'Hall of Mirrors'. Similar halls are also found in the contemporary palace of the Agra Fort, and show influence on the later additions to Amber Fort.

== History ==
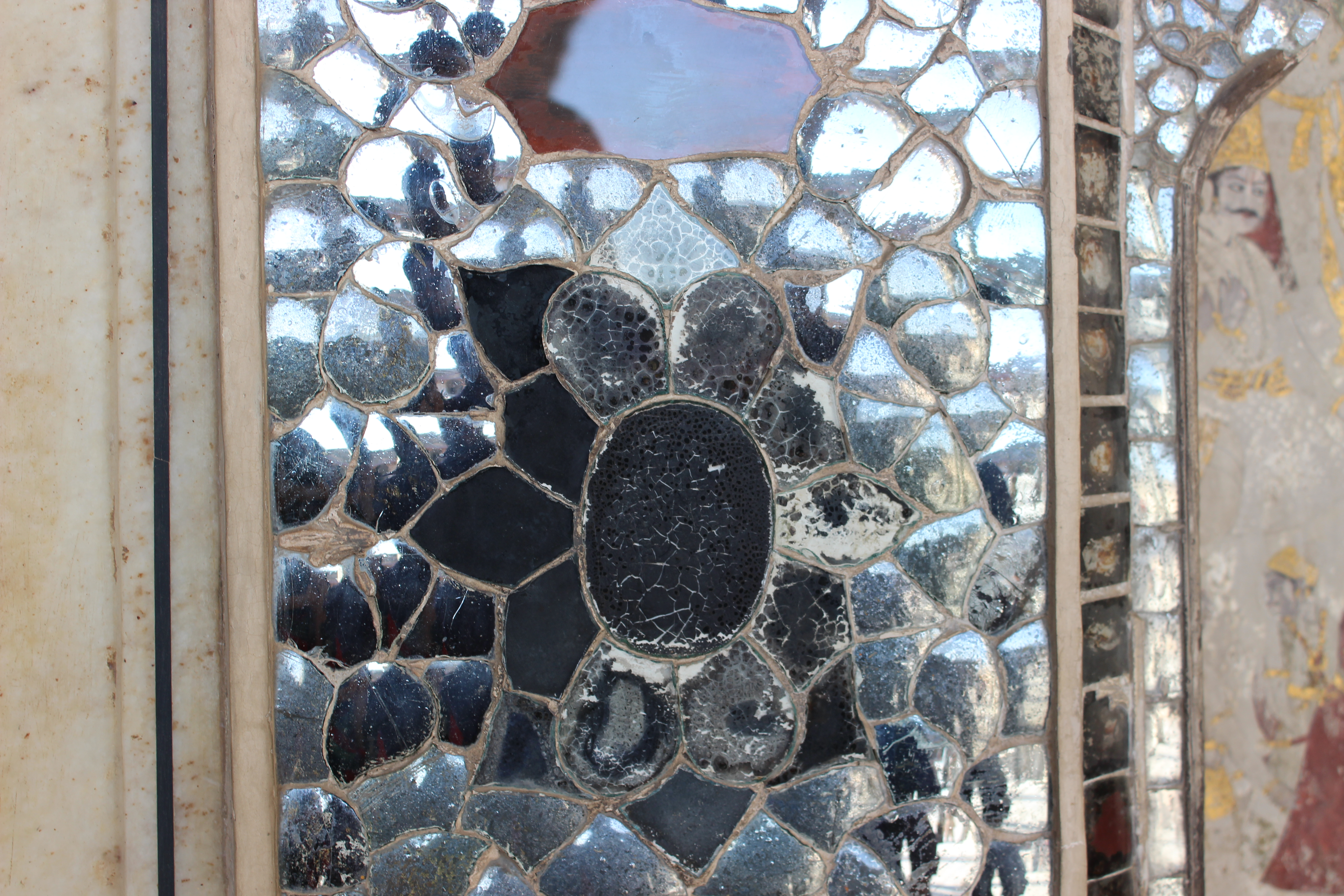
Close up view of the building's mirror-work

The solid brick foundations of Lahore Fort were laid in 1566 under the reign of Mughal emperor Akbar the Great on the location of an earlier mud-fort. To build the new fort, the Emperor brought experienced artisans after the completion of Fatehpur Sikri. Later, Shah Jahan converted the fort into a pleasure resort and added Diwan-i-Khas, Moti Masjid, Naulakha Pavilion, sleeping chambers, and Sheesh Mahal in to the complex. Sheesh Mahal is located within the Shah Burj (King's Pavilion) block that was actually built by his predecessor Jahangir. The chamber was exclusively used for private council meetings as part of the daily routine of the emperor, whereas the whole block was only accessible to the imperial princes, the vizier, and selected courtiers. The extension work of private quarters by Shah Jahan continued between 1628 and 1634. The distinctive Shah Jahani architecture is reflected in the extensive use of white marble and hierarchical accents of the construction. During the Sikh Empire, Shah Burj became Ranjit Singh's favourite place. He built a harem over the top of Sheesh Mahal. Kangra style frescoes were also added during his reign, and the original entrance to the Sheesh Mahal quadrangle was closed off and the Athdara built in its place. This was also the place where he used to display his prized possession, the Koh-i-Noor.

== Design ==
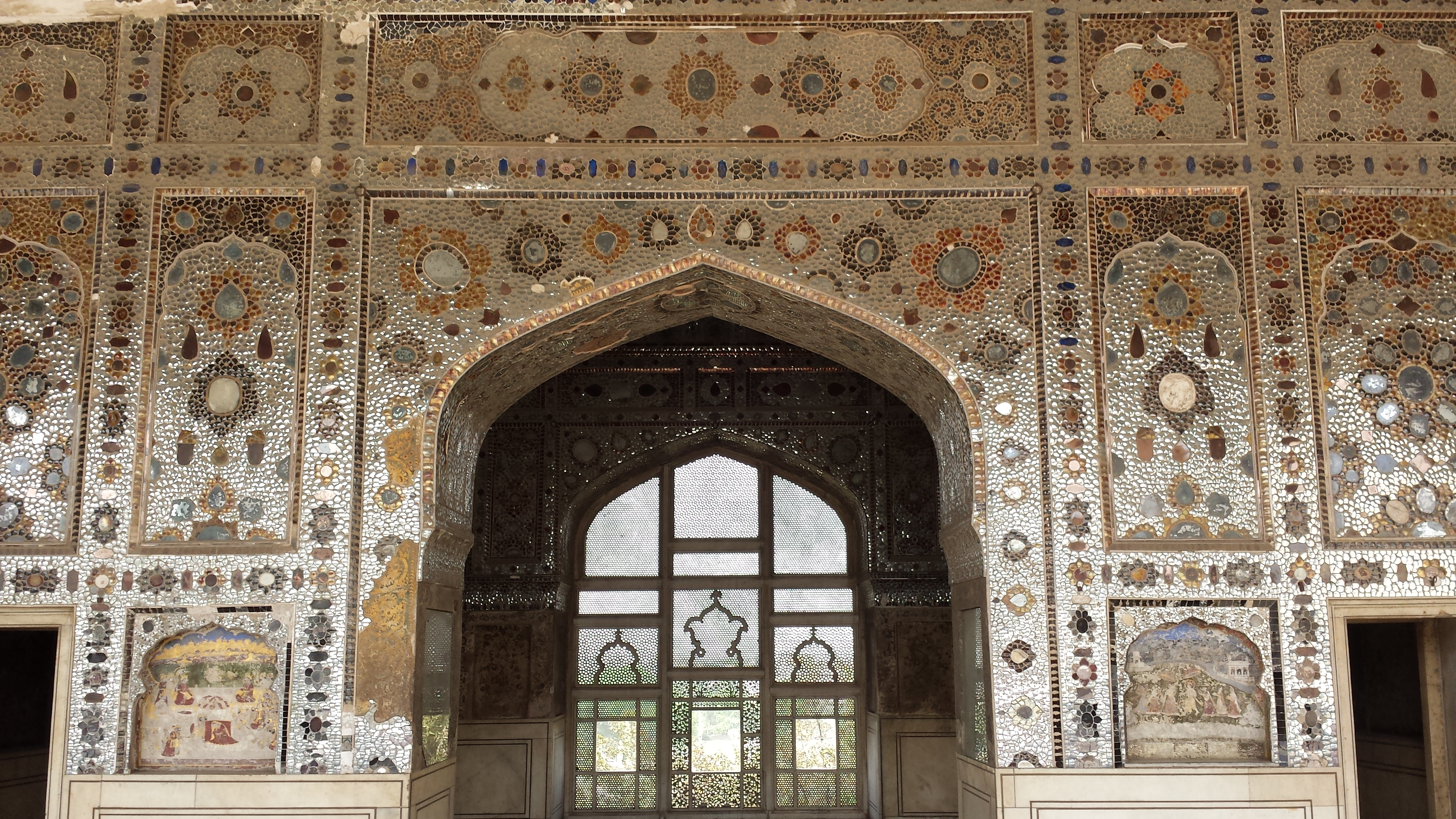
The Sheesh Mahal is elaborately decorated with a myriad of reflective glass tiles.

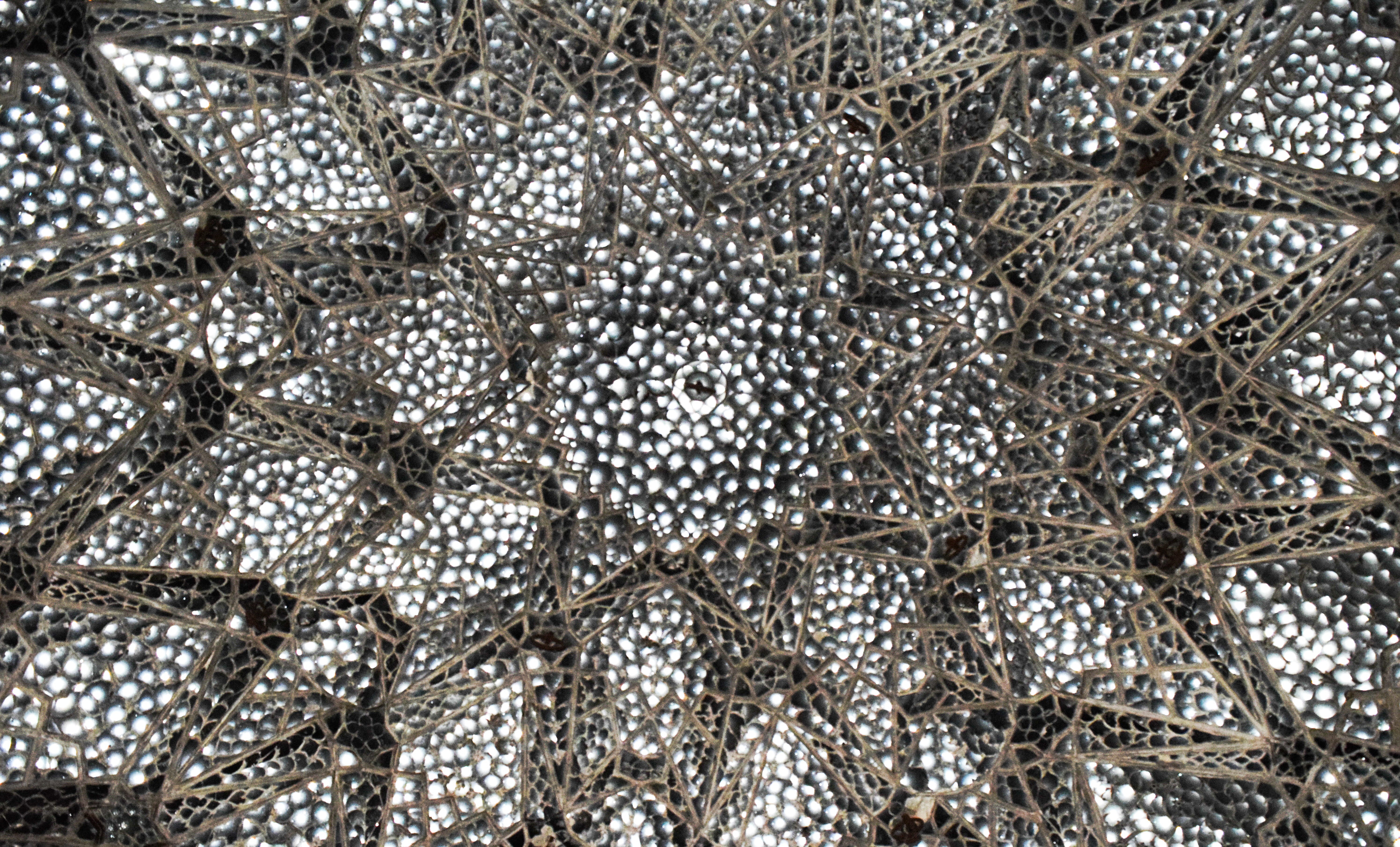
The building's ceiling is also adorned with mirror-work.

The Sheesh Mahal was built by Emperor Shah Jahan. It was built in the middle of Jahangir's rule. The façade, consisting of five cusped marble arches supported by coupled columns, opens into the courtyard. The engrailed spandrels and bases are inlaid with precious stones. The pavilion is in the form of a semi-octagon, and consists of apartments roofed with gilded cupolas and intricately decorated with pietra dura and convex glass and mirror mosaic (ayina kari) with thousands of small mirrors. At night they light candles. The decorative features also include stucco tracery (munabat kari) and carved marble screens in geometrical and tendril designs. The roof of the central hall rises up to two storeys. The hall was originally decorated with fresco paintings that were later replaced with glass mosaic in different colours.

== Conservation ==
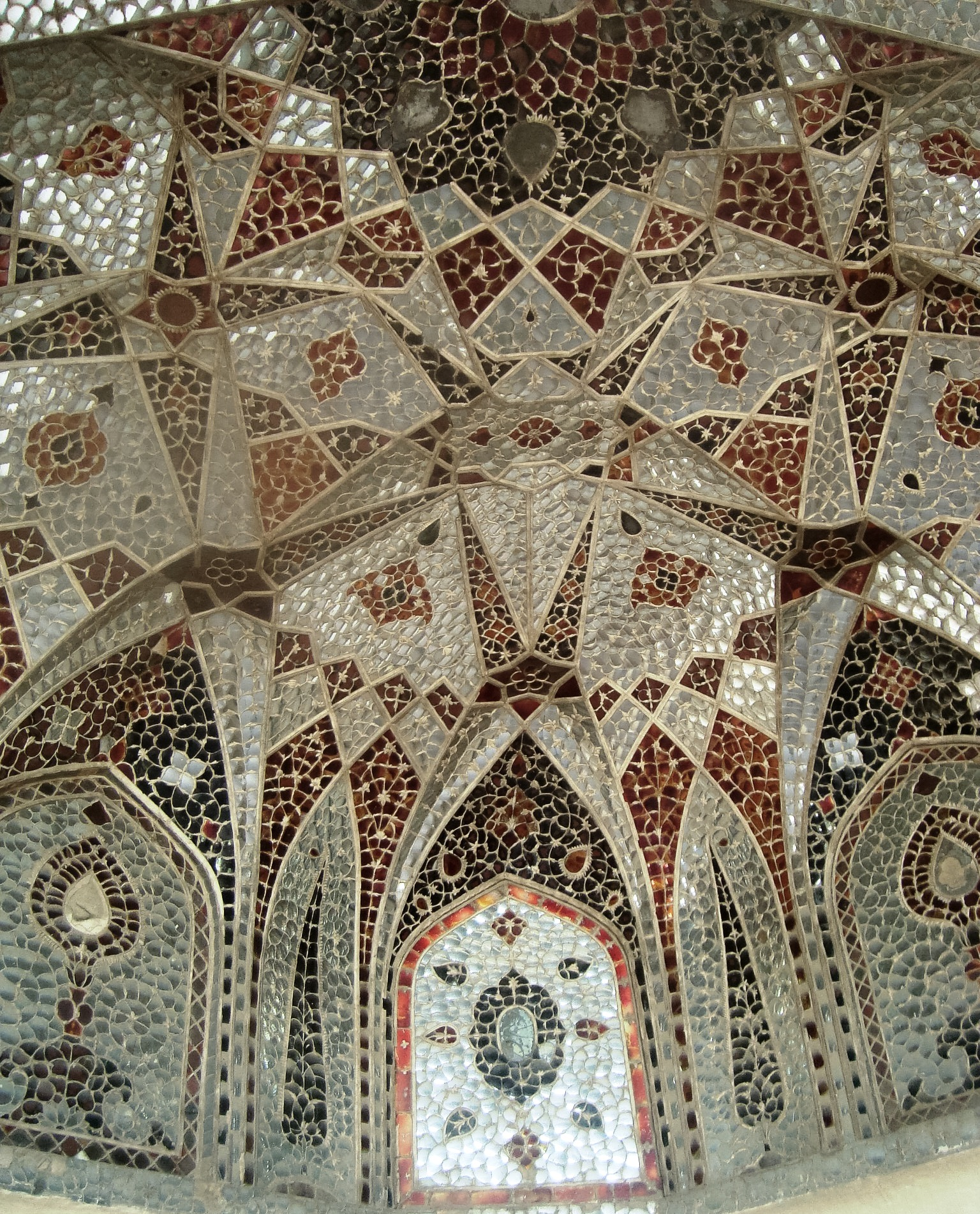
Coloured glass was also used throughout the interior.

The additional constructions carried out during the subsequent Sikh and British rules of Punjab on the top of Sheesh Mahal added to the dead load that made the structure vulnerable to collapse. In 1904–05, the plaster from the ceiling of main veranda fell apart, exposing the decay of internal wooden beams and the corroding roof. At this stage, the building was listed by the department of archaeology of British India in 1927 and the repair work was carried out. Similar problems arose in 1960s and were resolved through minor repairs. In 1975, Sheesh Mahal was listed as a protected monument under the Antiquities Act by Pakistan's Department of Archaeology whereas in 1981, as part of the larger Lahore Fort Complex, it became inscribed as a UNESCO World Heritage Site. It was not until 2006 that the problems of the ceiling were comprehensively resolved and the structure was restored.

== Gallery ==
=== Historical ===
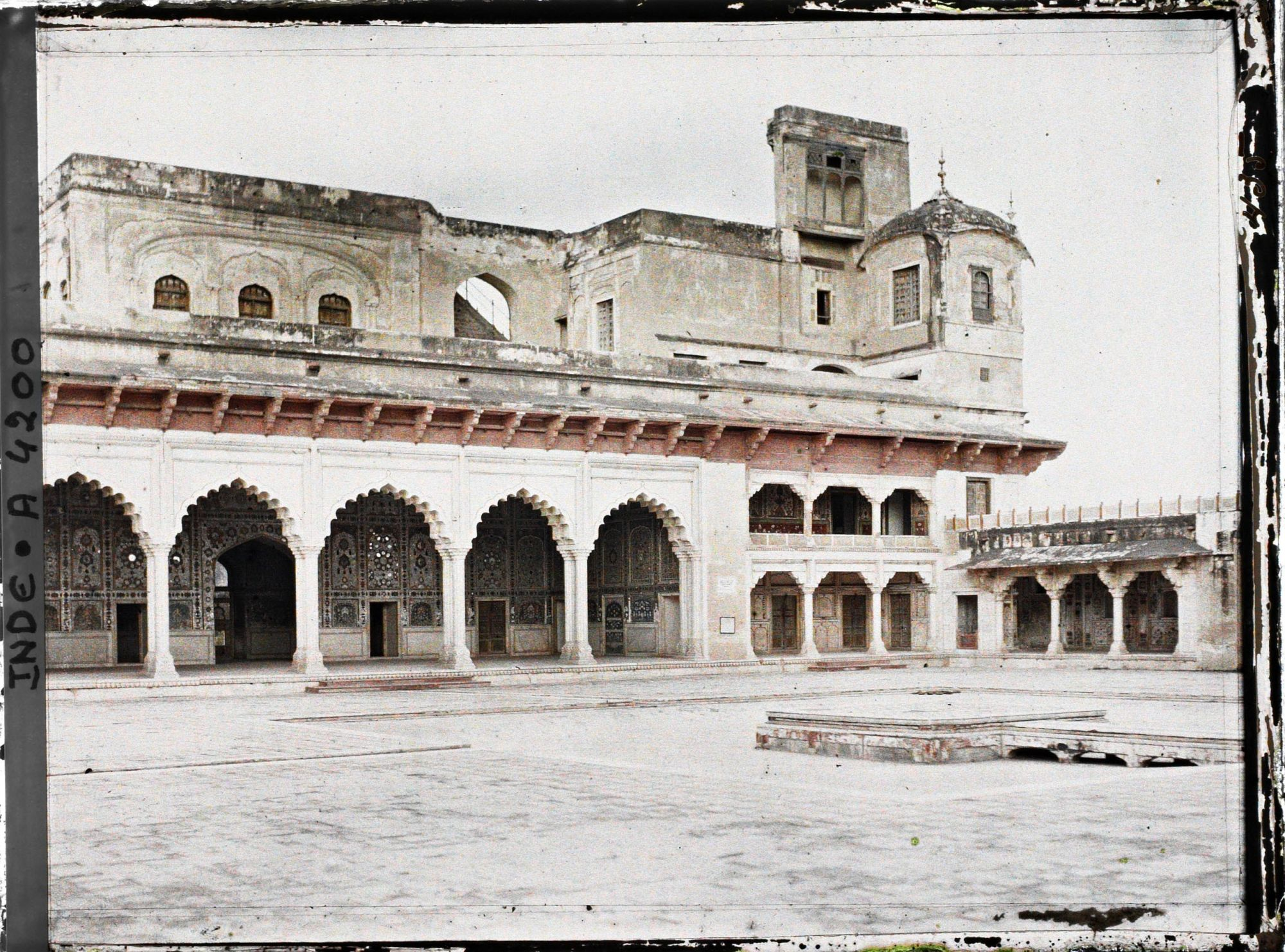
True-colour photograph of the Shish Mahal of Lahore Fort, Lahore, Punjab, taken by Stéphane Passet, circa 10–15 January 1914

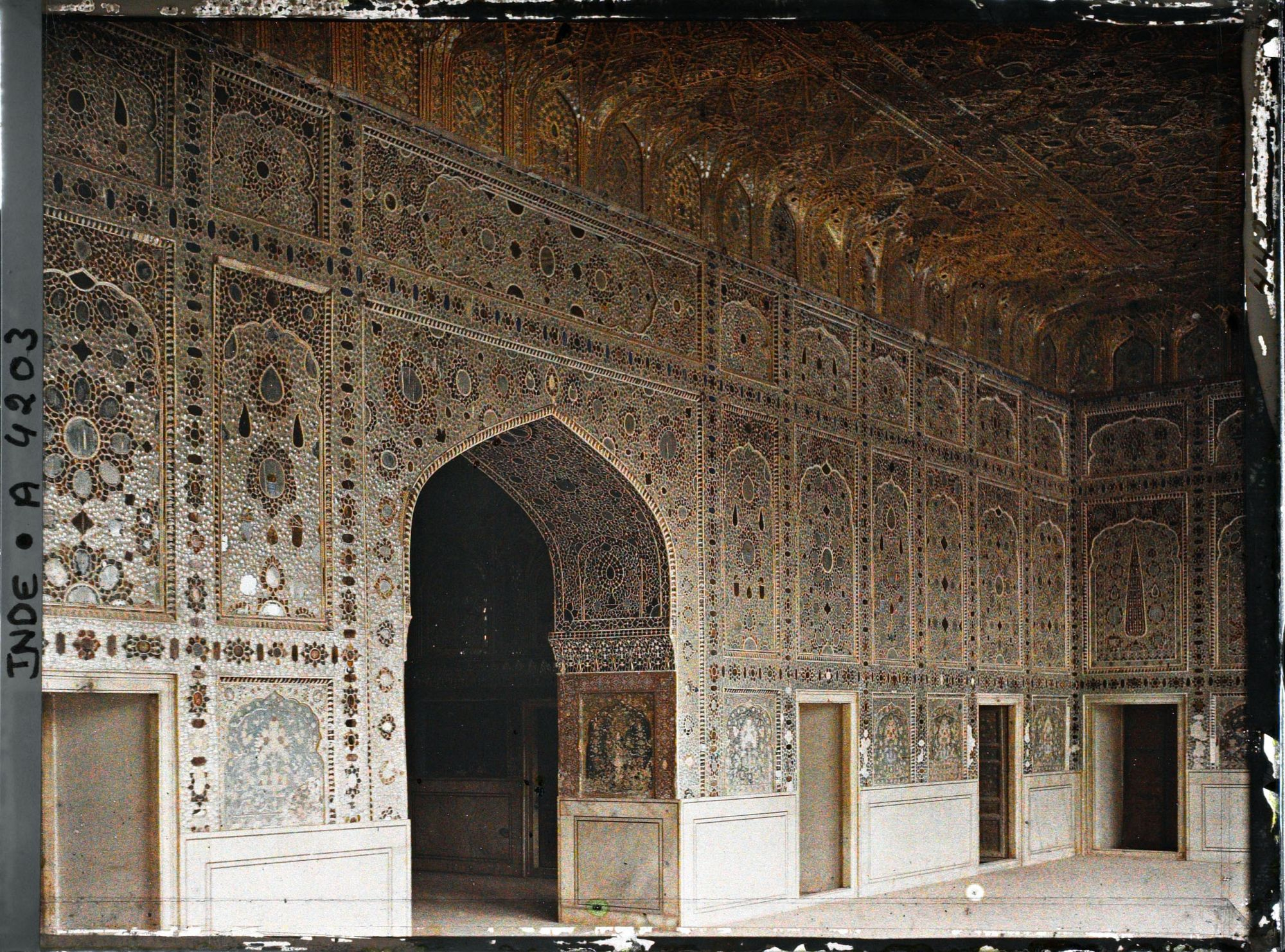
True-colour photograph of the interior of the reception hall of the Shish Mahal of the Lahore Fort, Lahore, Punjab, by Stéphane Passet, 10 January 1914

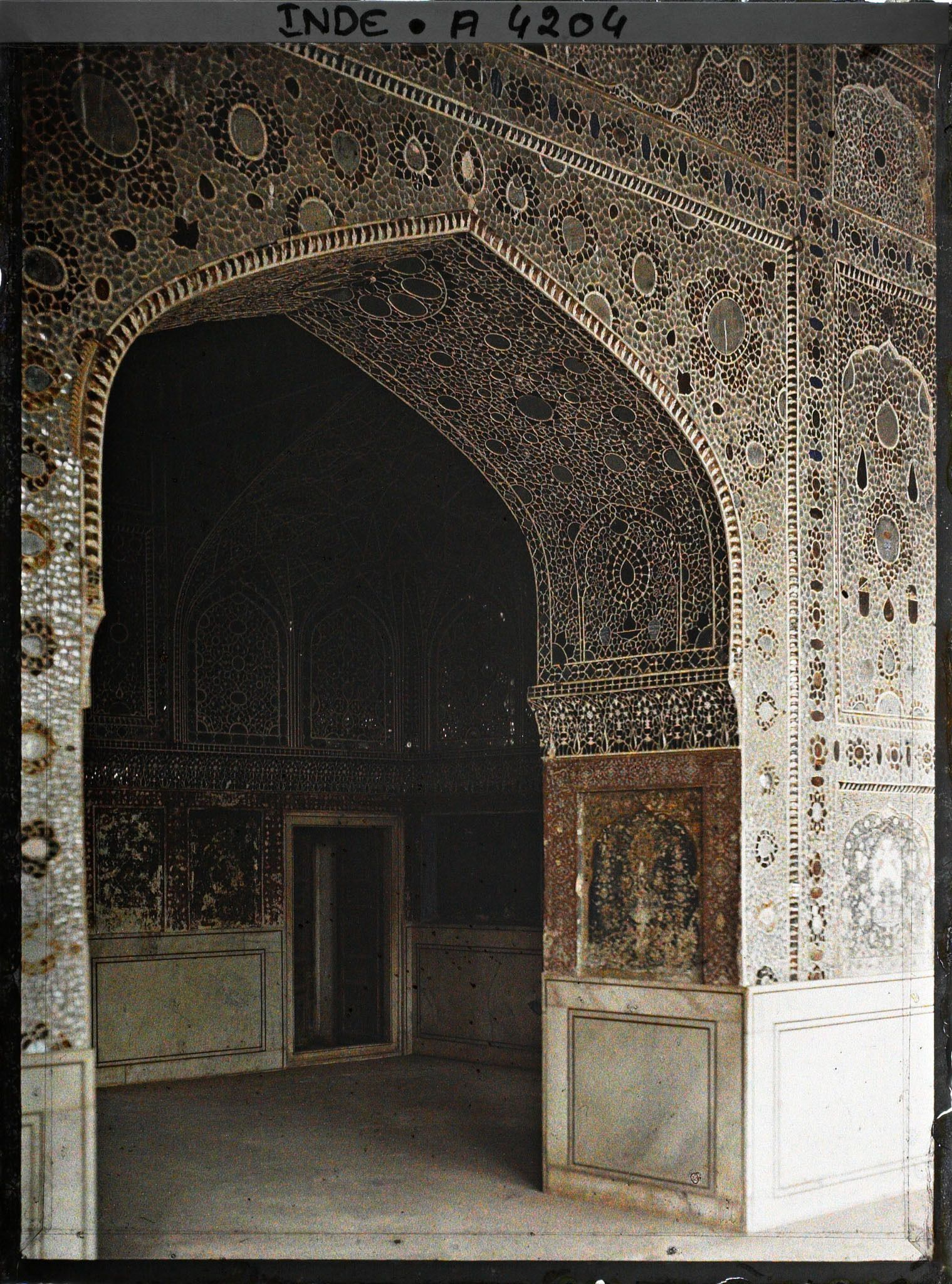
True-colour photograph of the inner-door of the reception hall of the Shish Mahal of the Lahore Fort, Lahore, Punjab, by Stéphane Passet, 10 January 1914

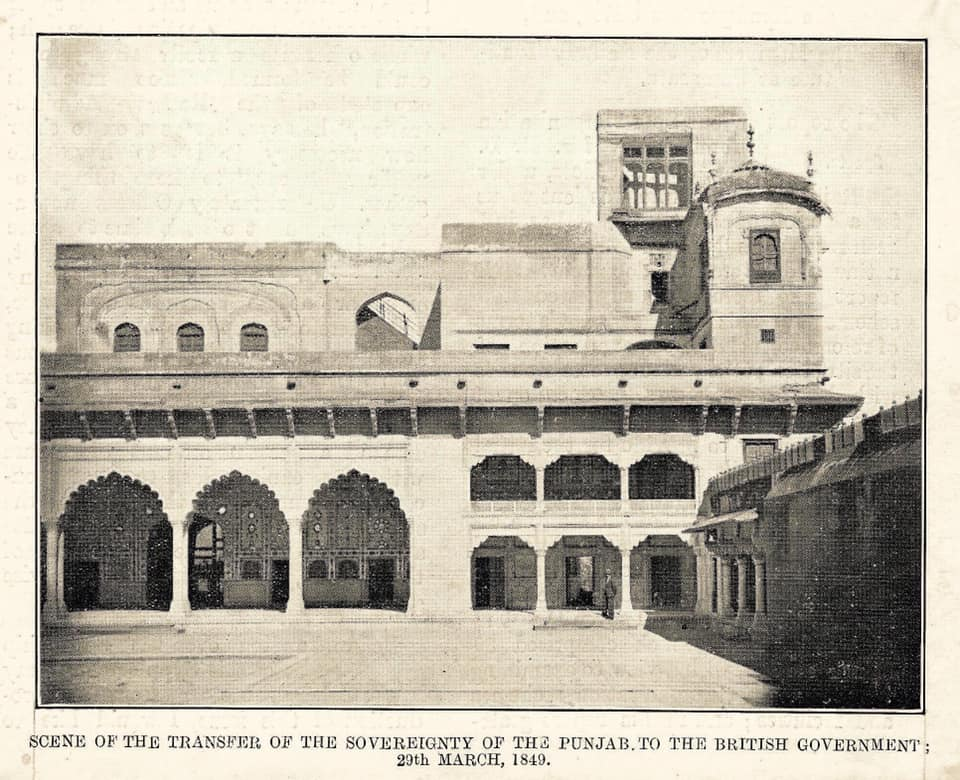
Photograph captioned 'Scene of the transfer of the sovereignty of the Punjab to the British Government; 29th March, 1849.', the Shish Mahal of the Lahore Fort, where the Sikh Empire was formally annexed.

=== Modern ===
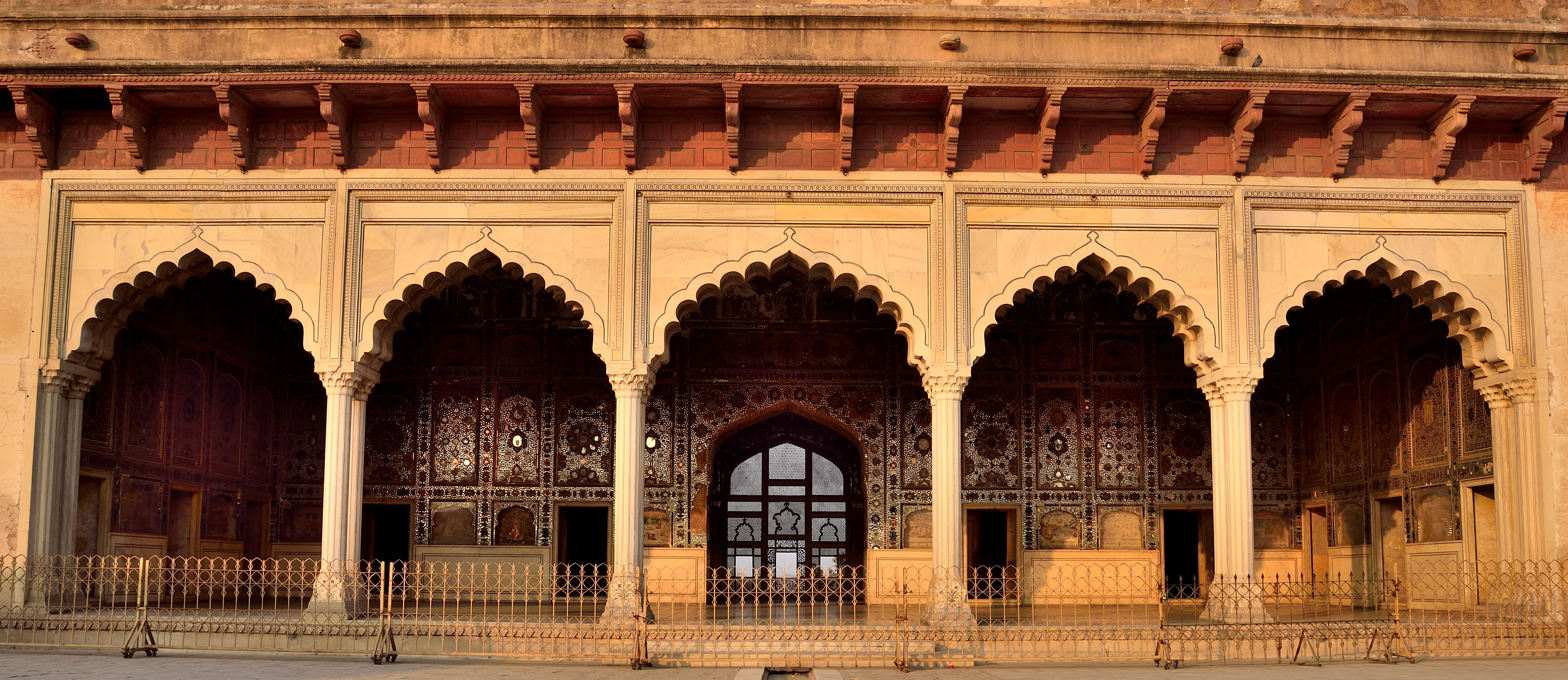
A view of the Sheesh Mahal's façade

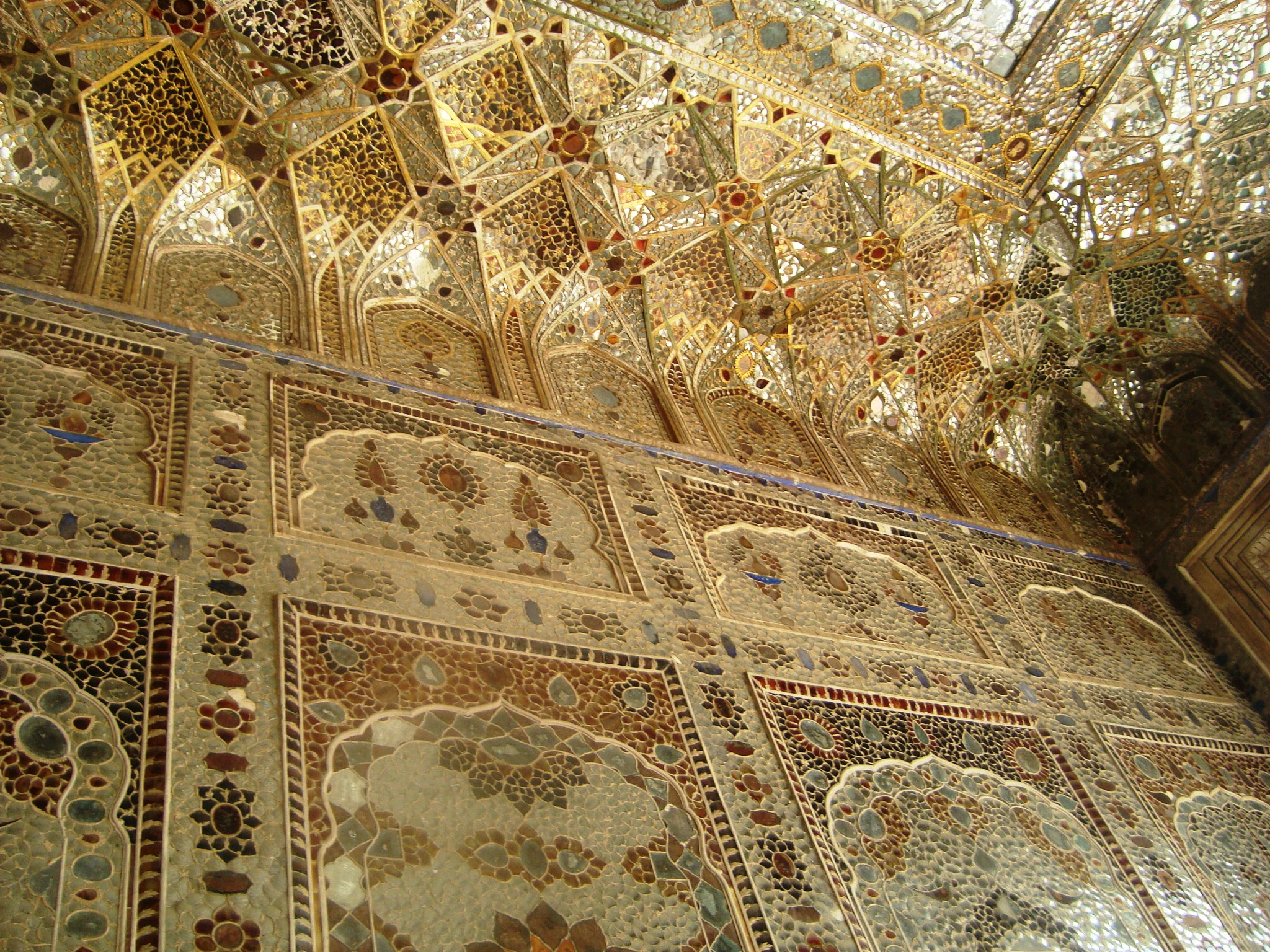

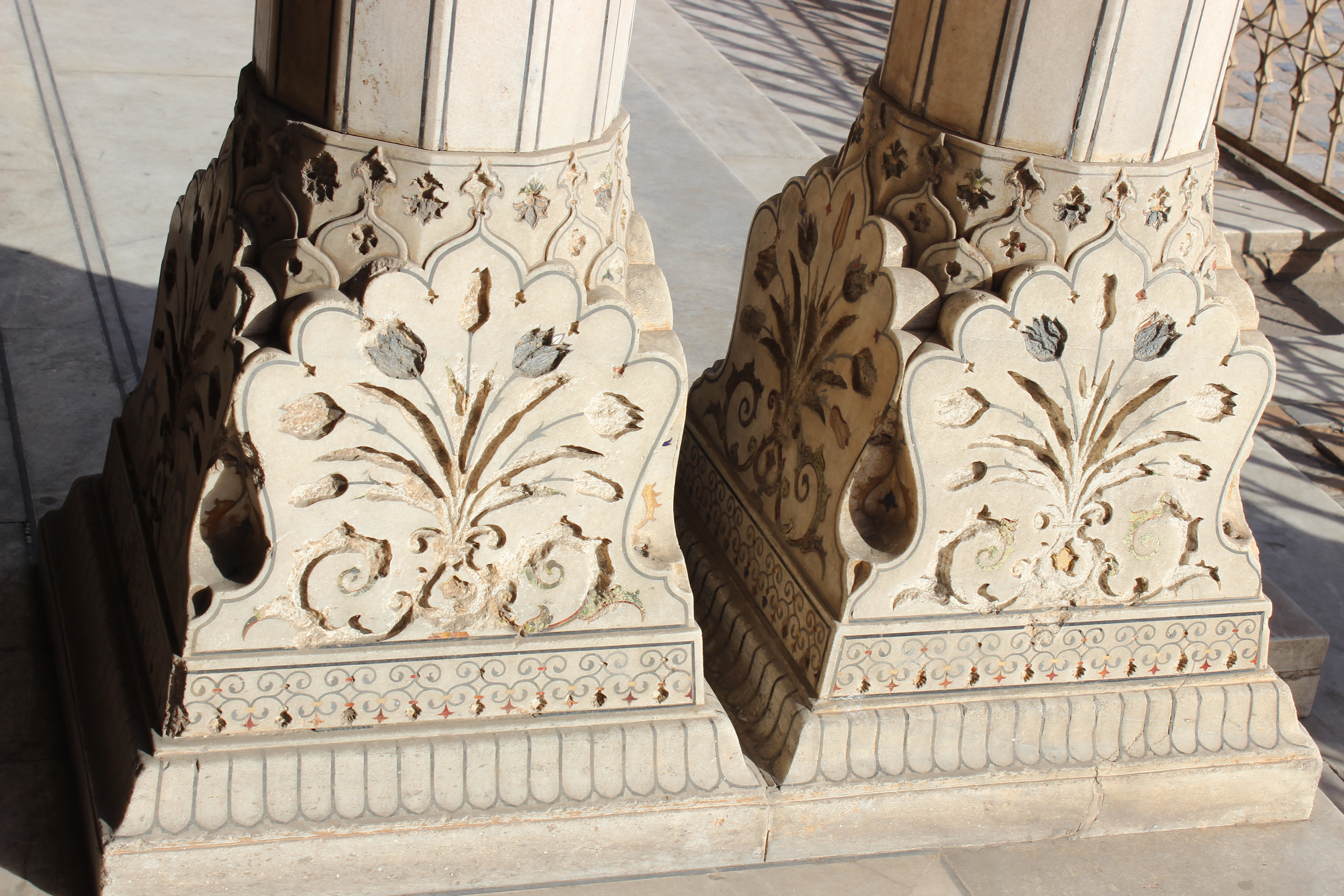
The pillars used in the buildings were decorated with floral motifs

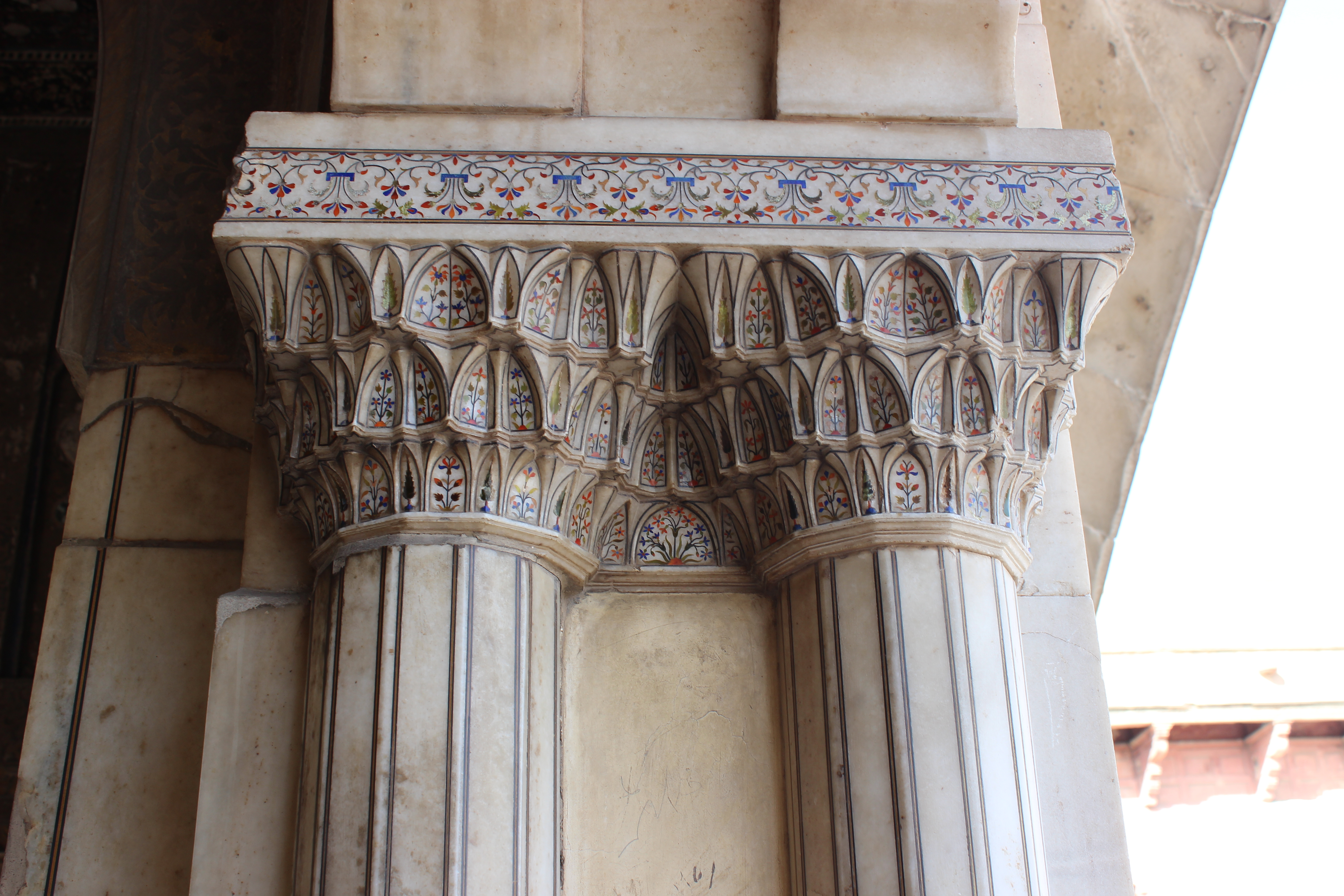

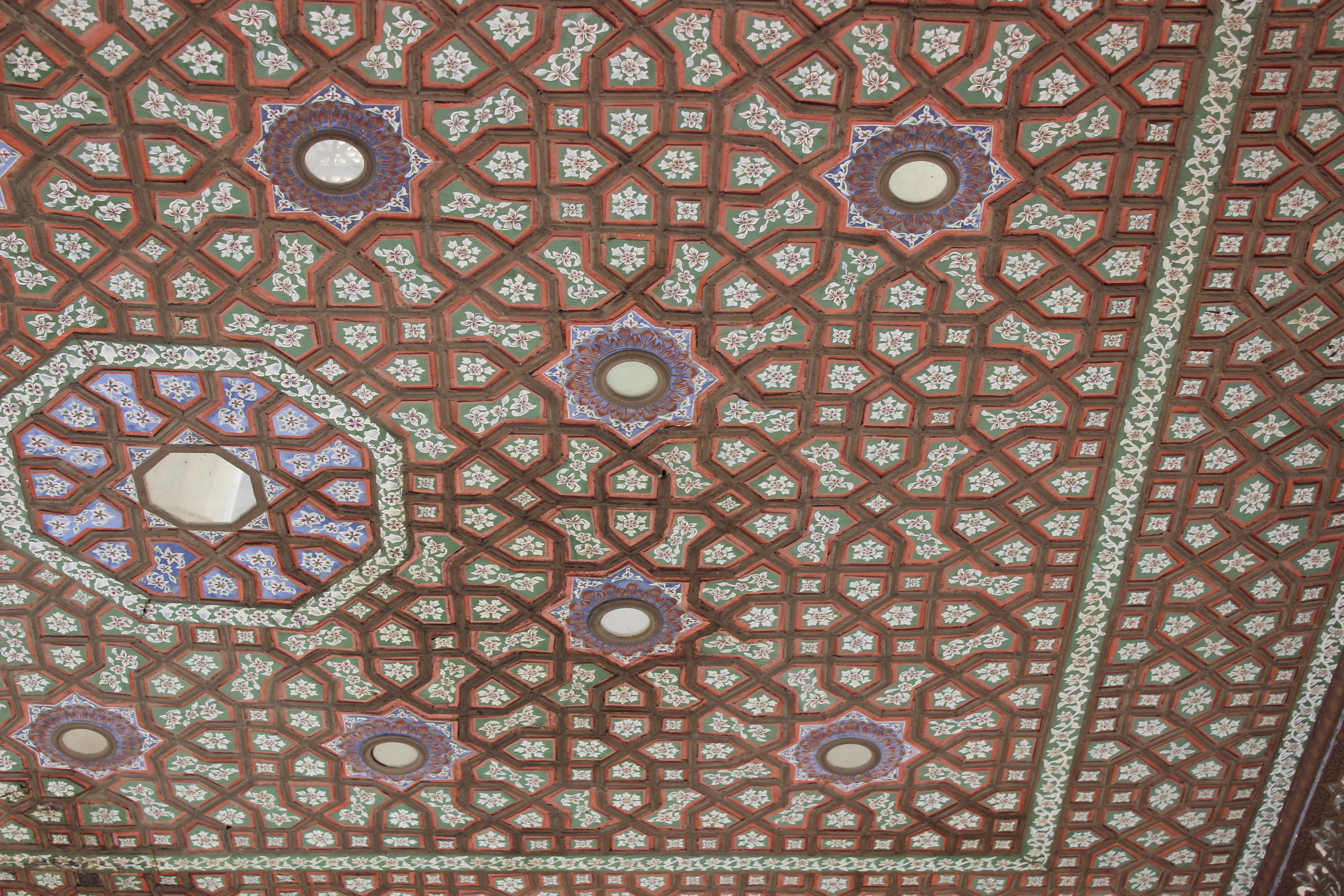
Sheesh Mahal's ceilings

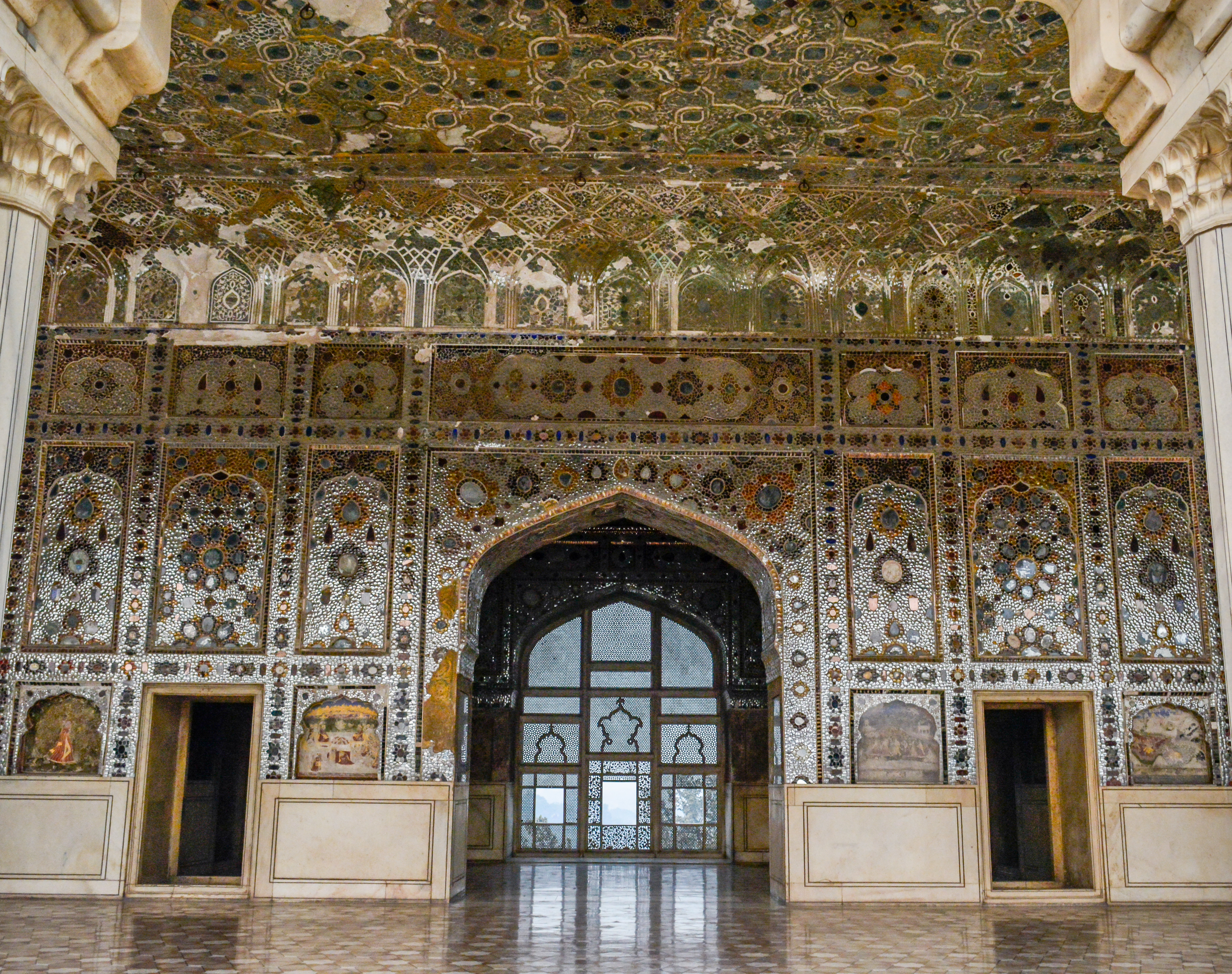

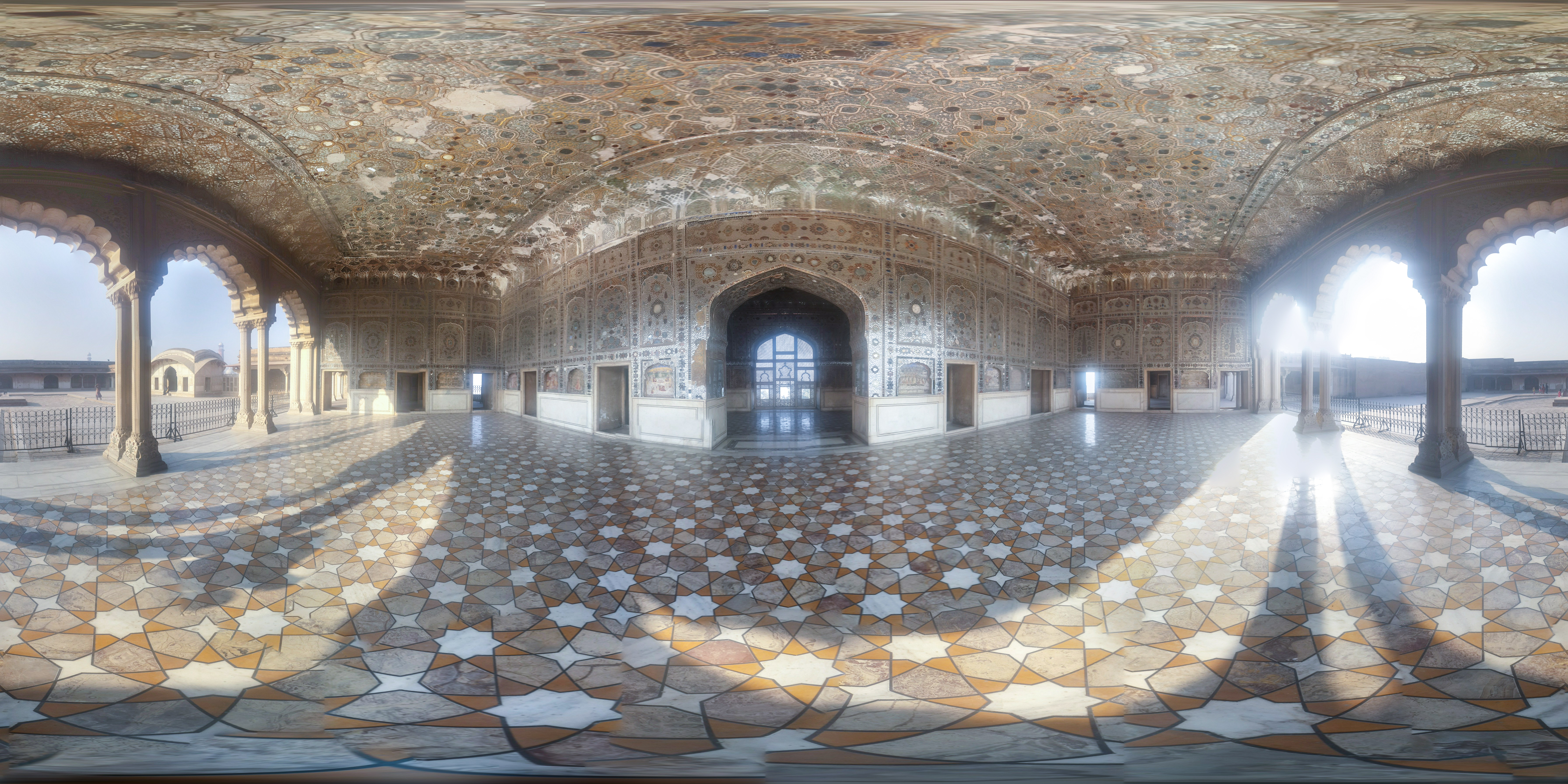
Interior panorama view.

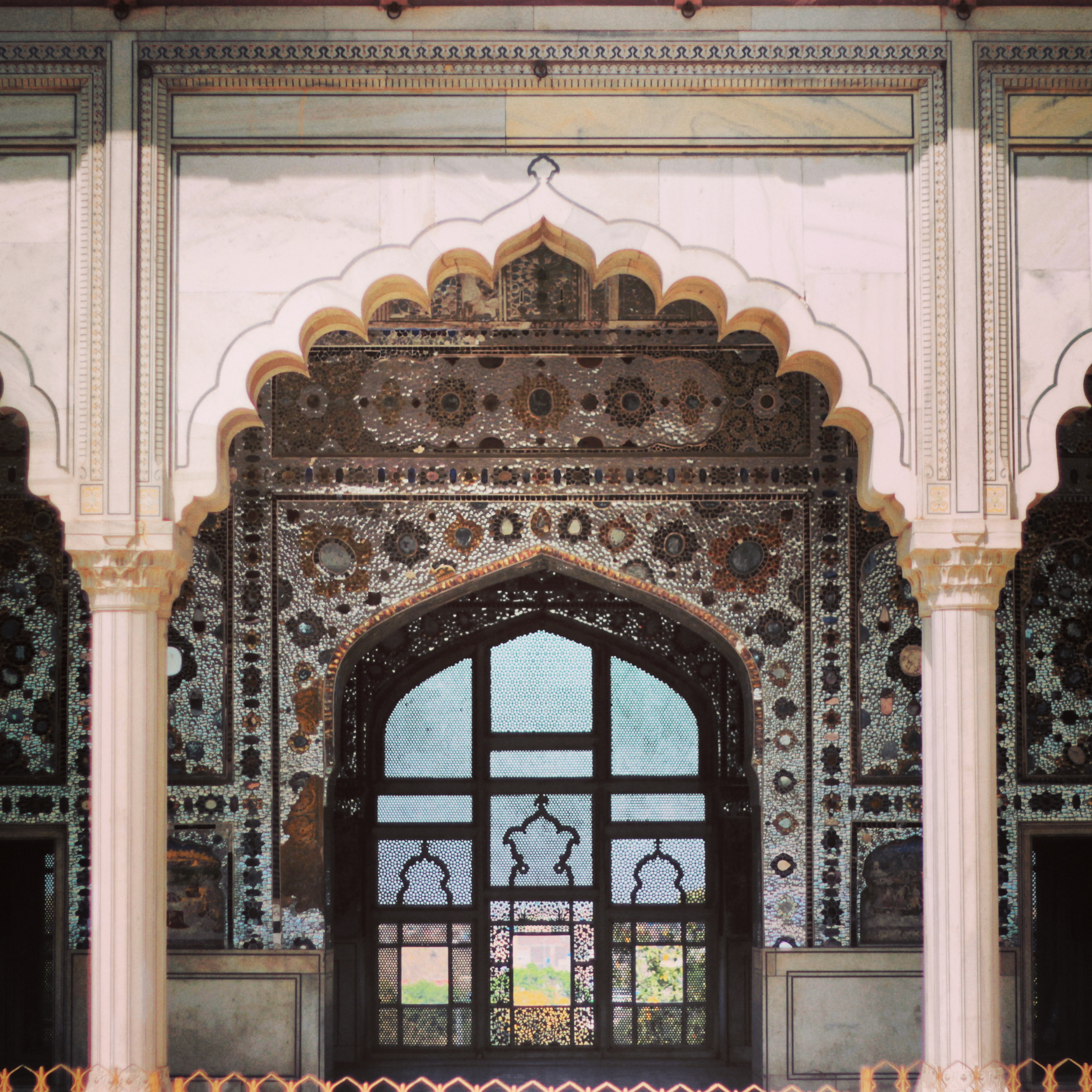

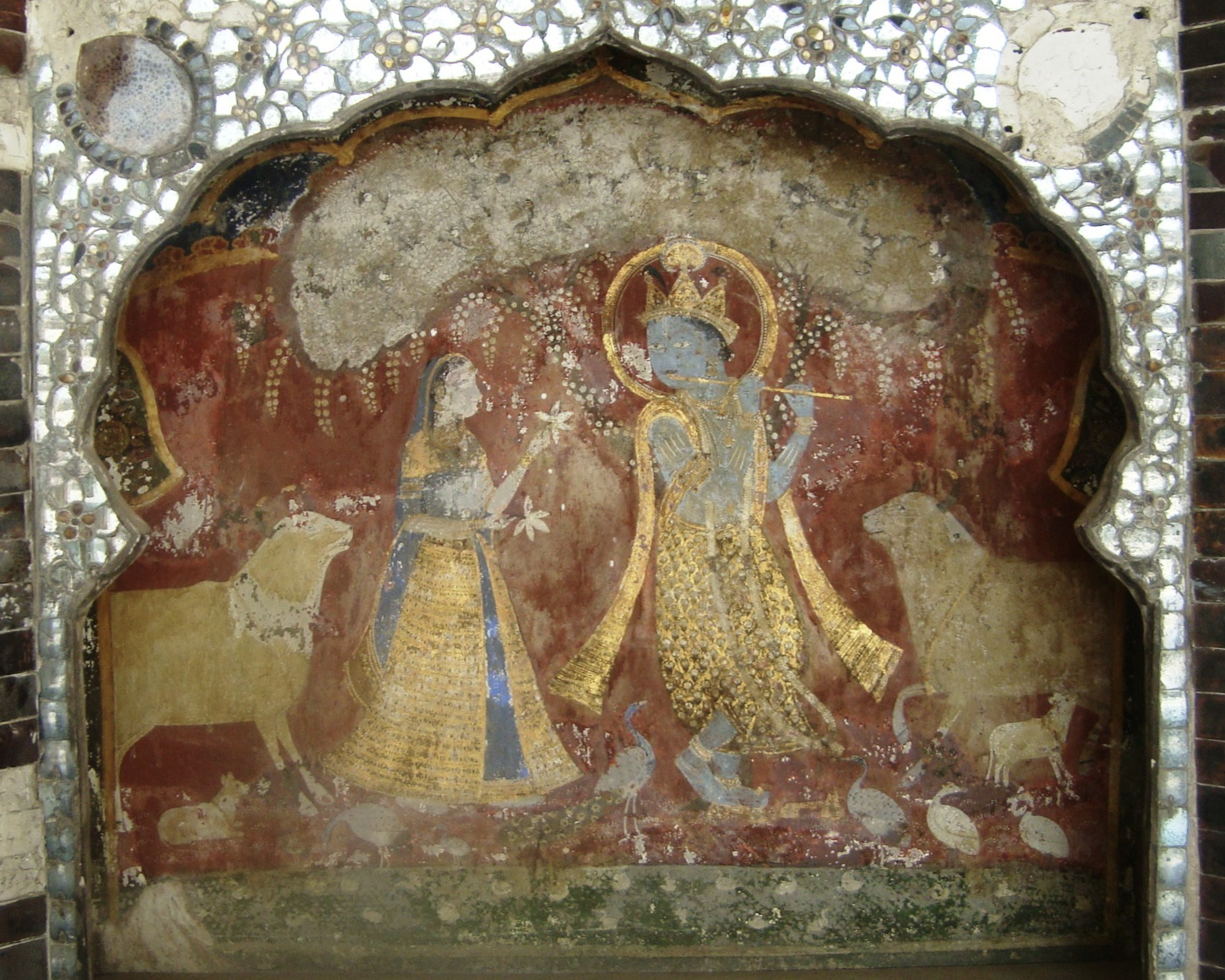
Another Sikh era Kangra mural of Hindu deities

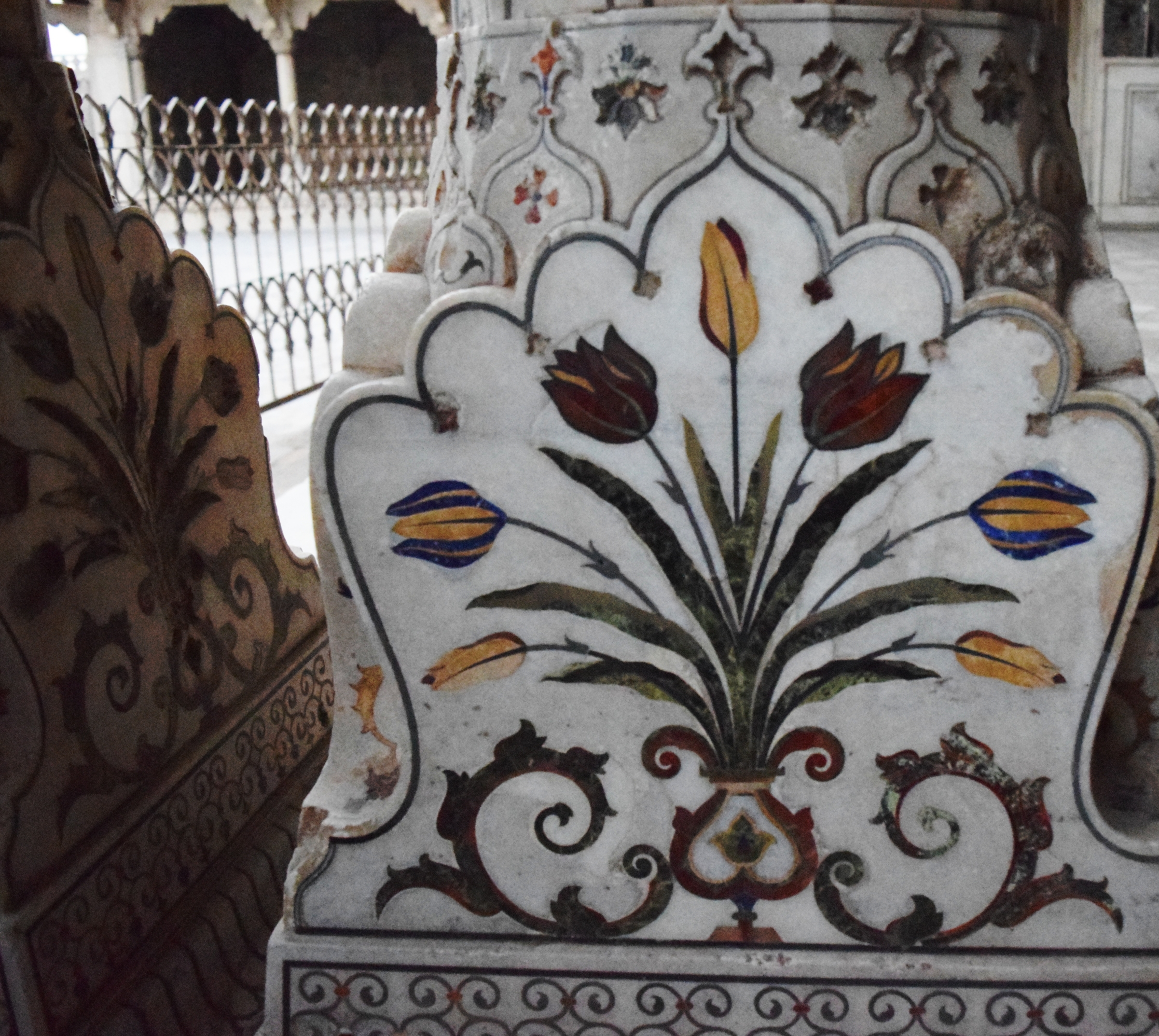

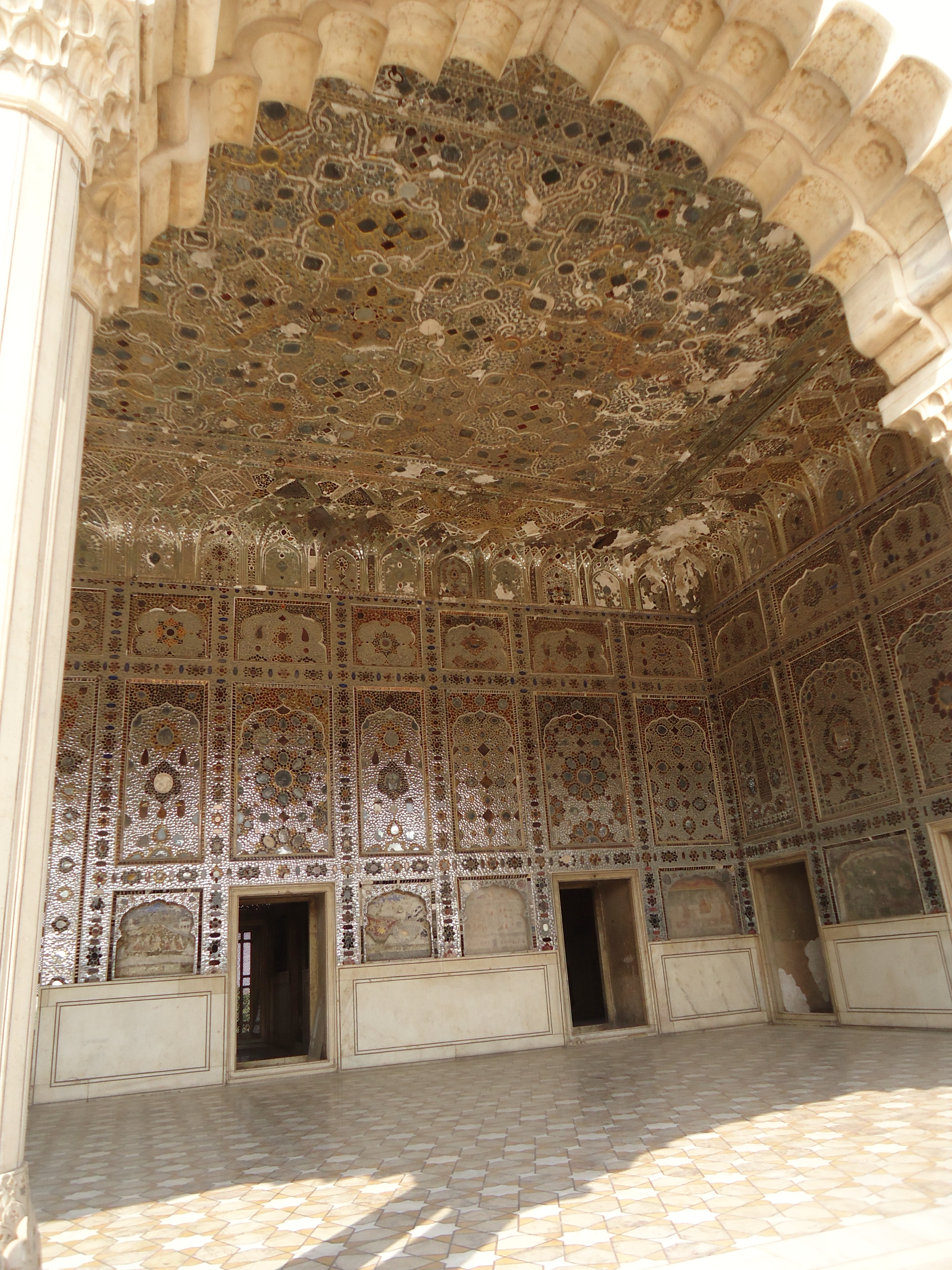

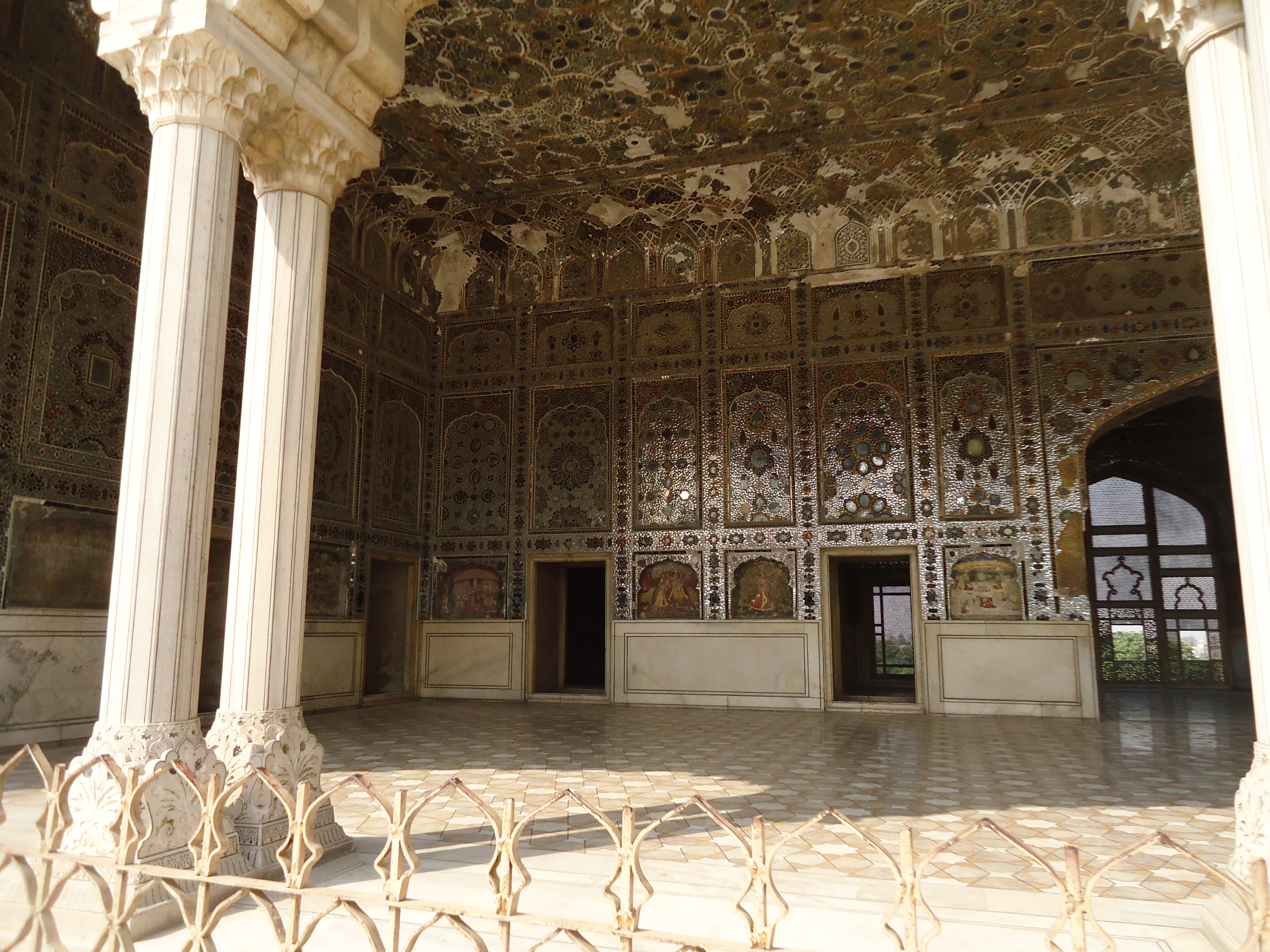

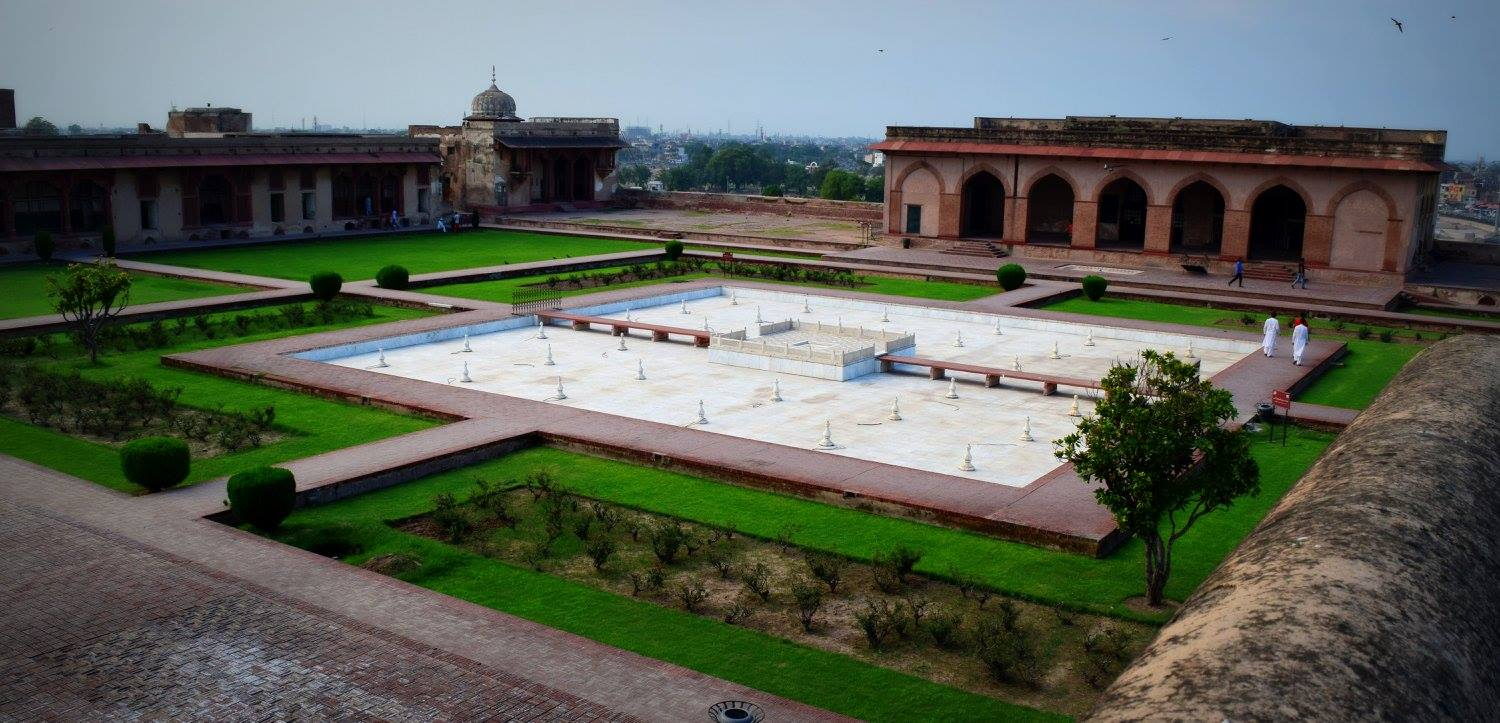
Sheesh Mahal Garden

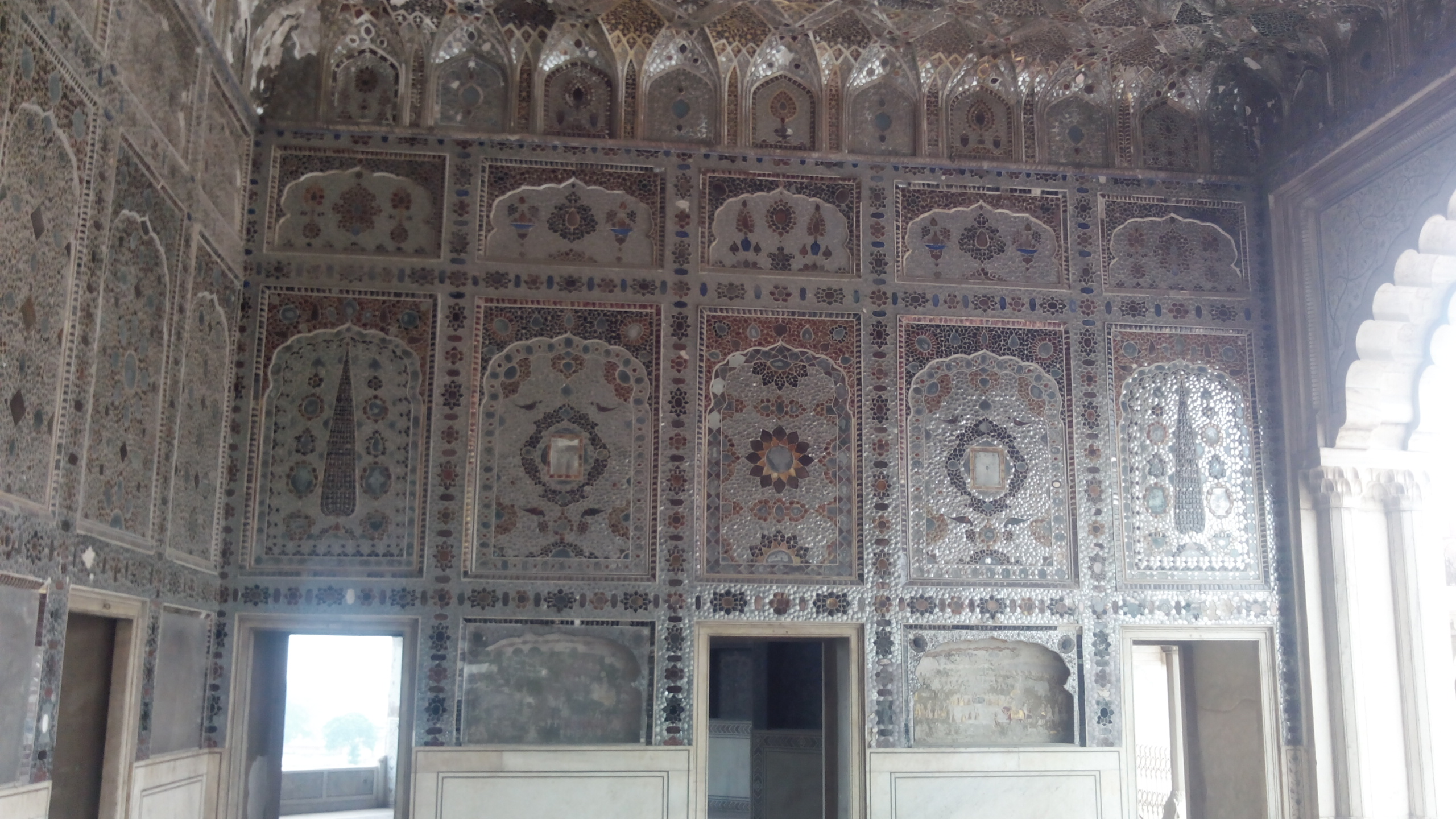
Inside Sheesh Mahal

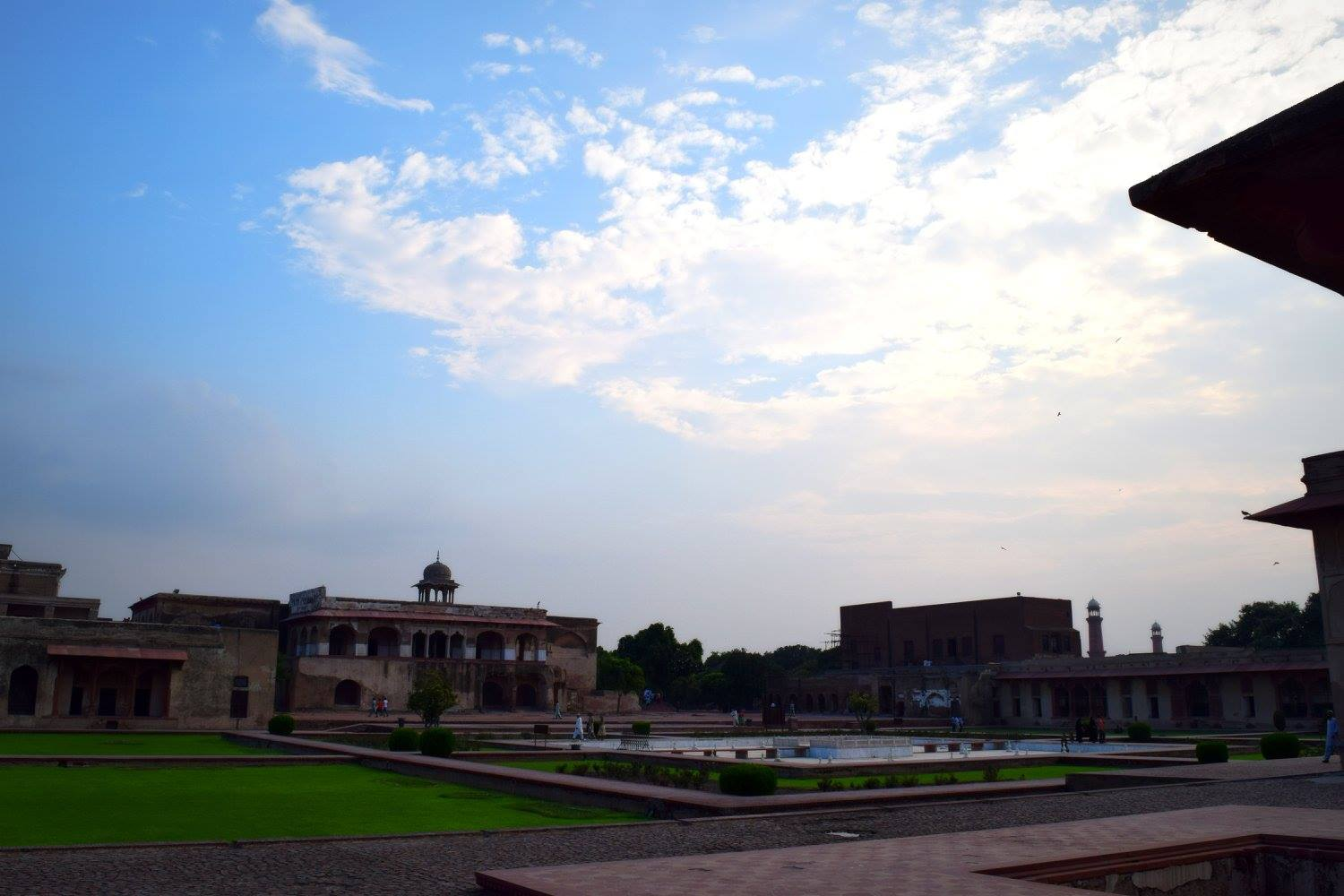

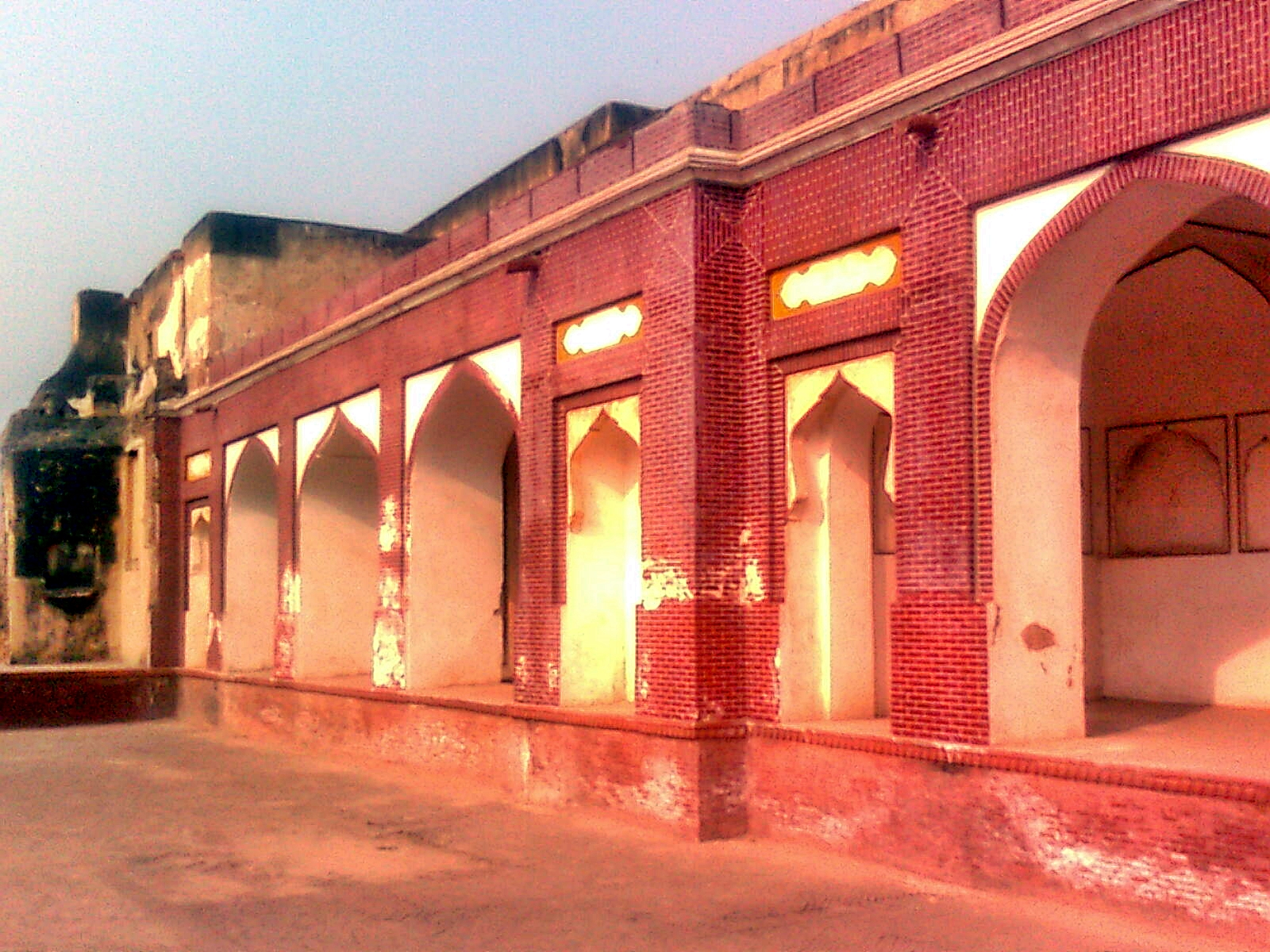
Sheesh Mahal – Lahore Fort

== See also ==
- Badshahi Mosque
- Shalimar Gardens
- Walled City of Lahore
- List of UNESCO World Heritage Sites in Pakistan
