= Murshidabad-Jiaganj =

- Community development block
- Interactive map of Murshidabad-Jiaganj
- Coordinates: 24.23°N 88.27°E
- Country: India
- State: West Bengal
- District: Murshidabad

Government
  - Type: Federal democracy

Area
  - Total: 208.62 km^{2} (80.55 sq mi)
- Elevation: 20 m (66 ft)

Population (2011)
  - Total: 234,565
  - Density: 1,124.4/km^{2} (2,912.1/sq mi)

Languages
  - Official: Bengali, English

Literacy
  - Literacy (2011): 69.14%
- Time zone: UTC+5:30 (IST)
- PIN: 742149 (Murshidabad); 742187 (Radharghat); 742140 (Jemo Rajbati); 742113 (Jiaganj)
- Telephone/STD code: 03482
- ISO 3166 code: IN-WB
- Vehicle registration: WB-57, WB-58
- Lok Sabha constituency: Murshidabad
- Vidhan Sabha constituency: Murshidabad
- Website: murshidabad.gov.in

Murshidabad-Jiaganj is a community development block that forms an administrative division in the Lalbag subdivision of Murshidabad district in the Indian state of West Bengal.

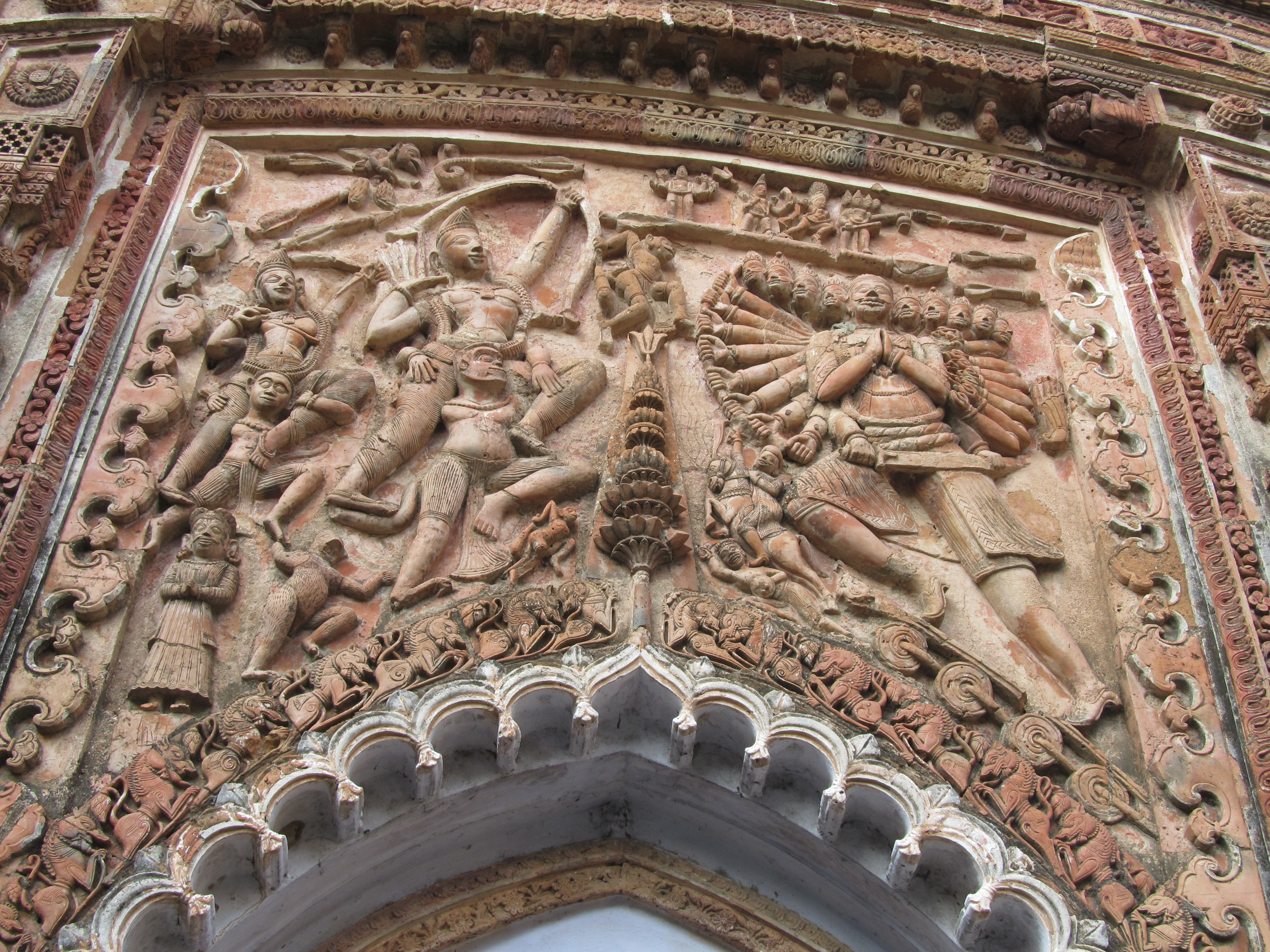
Terracotta relief at one of the Char Bangla Temples. It is shows the Last prayer of Ravana, the most famous among the wall-reliefs of Baronagar.

== Geography ==
Jiaganj is located at 24°14′N 88°16′E

Murshidabad-Jiaganj CD block lies in the Ganges-Bhagirathi Basin, which is a long and narrow river valley. The Bhagirathi River splits the district into two natural physiographic regions – Rarh on the west and Bagri on the east. It has fertile soil suitable for cultivation.

The Bagri or the eastern part of the district is a low lying alluvial plain with the shape of an isosceles triangle. The Ganges/Padma and the Bhagirathi form the two equal sides; the Jalangi forms the entire base; other offshoots of the Ganges meander within the area. It is vulnerable to flooding by the Bhagirathi and other rivers.

Murshidabad-Jiaganj CD block is bounded by Bhagawangola I and Bhagawangola II CD blocks in the north, Raninagar I CD block in the east, Berhampore CD block in the south and Nabagram CD block in the west.

Murshidabad-Jiaganj CD block has an area of 192.13 km^{2}. It has 1 panchayat samity, 8 gram panchayats, 153 gram sansads (village councils), 132 mouzas and 127 inhabited villages. Murshidabad and Jiaganj police stations serve this block. Headquarters of this CD block is at Murshidabad.

Gram panchayats in Murshidabad-Jiaganj CD block/ panchayat samiti are: Bahadurpur, Dahapara, Dangapara, Kapasdanga, Mukundabagh, Nutungram, Prosadpur and Tentulia.

== Demographics ==
=== Population ===
According to the 2011 Census of India, Murshidabad-Jiaganj CD block had a total population of 234,565, all of which were rural. There were 121,187 (52%) males and 113,378 (48%) females. The population in the age range 0-6 years was 28,993. Scheduled Castes numbered 40,442 (17.24%) and Scheduled Tribes numbered 12,326 (5.25%).

As per 2001 census, Murshidabad-Jiaganj block has a total population of 199,261, out of which 103,421 were males and 96,200 were females. Murshidabad-Jiaganj block registered a population growth of 26.11 per cent during the 1991-2001 decade. Decadal growth for the district was 23.70 per cent. Decadal growth in West Bengal was 17.84 per cent.

The decadal growth of population in Murshidabad-Jiaganj CD block in 2001-2011 was 17.13%.

=== Villages ===
Large villages in Murshidabad-Jiaganj CD block were (2011 population figure in brackets): Sanyasidanga (6,891), Talgachi (10,435), Chunakhali (5,599), Khanpur (7,118), Kapasdanda (5,154), Gudhia (9,660), Tentulia (7,576), Dharmmapur (5,319), Hasenpur (8,093) and Dangapara (4,900).

=== Literacy ===
As per the 2011 census, the total number of literate persons in Murshidabad-Jiaganj CD block was 142,137 (69.12% of the population over 6 years) out of which males numbered 77,495 (72.82% of the male population over 6 years) and females numbered 64,642 (65.16% of the female population over 6 years). The gender disparity (the difference between female and male literacy rates) was 7.66%.

See also – List of West Bengal districts ranked by literacy rate

Literacy in CD blocks of
Murshidabad district
Jangipur subdivision
Farakka – 59.75%
Samserganj – 54.98%
Suti I – 58.40%
Suti II – 55.23%
Raghunathganj I – 64.49%
Raghunathganj II – 61.17%
Sagardighi – 65.27%
Lalbag subdivision
Murshidabad-Jiaganj – 69.14%
Bhagawangola I - 57.22%
Bhagawangola II – 53.48%
Lalgola– 64.32%
Nabagram – 70.83%
Sadar subdivision
Berhampore – 73.51%
Beldanga I – 70.06%
Beldanga II – 67.86%
Hariharpara – 69.20%
Naoda – 66.09%
Kandi subdivision
Kandi – 65.13%
Khargram – 63.56%
Burwan – 68.96%
Bharatpur I – 62.93%
Bharatpur II – 66.07%
Domkol subdivision
Domkal – 55.89%
Raninagar I – 57.81%
Raninagar II – 54.81%
Jalangi – 58.73%
Source: 2011 Census: CD Block Wise
Primary Census Abstract Data

=== Language and religion ===
Religion in Murshidabad-Jiaganj CD block (2011)
Islam	54.52%
Hinduism	44.61%
Christianity	0.63%
Other or not stated	0.24%

In the 2011 census, Muslims numbered 127,886 and formed 54.52% of the population in Murshidabad-Jiaganj CD block. Hindus numbered 104,636 and formed 44.61% of the population. Others numbered 2,043 and formed 0.87% of the population. In Murshidabad-Jiaganj CD block while the proportion of Muslims increased marginally from 52.27% in 1991 to 52.81% in 2001, the proportion of Hindus declined marginally from 46.92% in 1991 to 46.03% in 2001.

Murshidabad district had 4,707,573 Muslims who formed 66.27% of the population, 2,359,061 Hindus who formed 33.21% of the population, and 37, 173 persons belonging to other religions who formed 0.52% of the population, in the 2011 census. While the proportion of Muslim population in the district increased from 61.40% in 1991 to 63.67% in 2001, the proportion of Hindu population declined from 38.39% in 1991 to 35.92% in 2001.

Languages of Murshidabad-Jiaganj CD block (2011)
1. Bengali (96.1%)
2. Hindi (1.25%)
3. Santali (1.07%)
4. Others (1.62%)

At the time of the 2011 census, 96.06% of the population spoke Bengali, 1.25% Hindi and 1.07% Santali as their first language.

== Rural poverty ==
As per the Human Development Report 2004 for West Bengal, the rural poverty ratio in Murshidabad district was 46.12%. Purulia, Bankura and Birbhum districts had higher rural poverty ratios. These estimates were based on Central Sample data of NSS 55th round 1999-2000.

== Economy ==
=== Livelihood ===
In Murshidabad Jiaganj-CD block in 2011, amongst the class of total workers, cultivators numbered 15,450 and formed 18.06%, agricultural labourers numbered 36,829 and formed 43.06%, household industry workers numbered 5,127 and formed 5.99% and other workers numbered 28,124 and formed 32.88%.

=== Infrastructure ===
There are 127 inhabited villages in Murshidabad-Jiaganaj CD block. 100% villages have power supply and drinking water supply. 14 villages (11.02%) have post offices. 115 villages (90.55%) have telephones (including landlines, public call offices and mobile phones). 57 villages (44.88%) have a pucca approach road and 54 villages (44.52%) have transport communication (includes bus service, rail facility and navigable waterways). 7 villages (5.51%) have agricultural credit societies and 11 villages (8.66%) have banks.

=== Agriculture ===
Persons engaged in agriculture
in Murshidabd-Jiaganj CD block
1. Bargadars (4.90%)
2. Patta holders (7.40%)
3. Small farmers (5.25%)
4. Marginal farmers (34.6%)
5. Agricultural labourers (47.9%)

From 1977 onwards major land reforms took place in West Bengal. Land in excess of land ceiling was acquired and distributed amongst the peasants. Following land reforms land ownership pattern has undergone transformation. In 2013-14, persons engaged in agriculture in Murshidabad-Jiaganj CD block could be classified as follows: bargadars 3,766 (4.90%), patta (document) holders 5,690 (7.40%), small farmers (possessing land between 1 and 2 hectares) 4,040 (5.25%), marginal farmers (possessing land up to 1 hectare) 26,585 (34.57%) and agricultural labourers 36,829 (47.89%).

Murshidabad-Jiaganj II CD block had 130 fertiliser depots, 3 seed stores and 41 fair price shops in 2013-14.

In 2013-14, Murshidabad-Jiaganj CD block produced 671 tonnes of Aman paddy, the main winter crop from 307 hectares, 5,431 tonnes of Boro paddy (spring crop) from 1,691 hectares, 141 tonnes of Aus paddy (summer crop) from 75 hectares, 8,930 tonnes of wheat from 3,985 hectares, 31 tonnes of maize from 12 hectares, 91,177 tonnes of jute from 7,991 hectares and 9,499 tonnes of potatoes from 495 hectares. It also produced pulses and oilseeds.

In 2013-14, the total area irrigated in Murshidabad-Jiaganj CD block was 9,889 hectares, out of which 150 hectares were irrigated with canal water, 2,500 hectares with tank water, 959 hectares with river lift irrigation, 920 hectares by deep tube well, 320 hectares with shallow tube well and 5,040 hectares by other means.

=== Silk and handicrafts ===
Murshidabad is famous for its silk industry since the Middle Ages. There are three distinct categories in this industry, namely (i) Mulberry cultivation and silkworm rearing (ii) Peeling of raw silk (iii) Weaving of silk fabrics.

Ivory carving is an important cottage industry from the era of the Nawabs. The main areas where this industry has flourished are Khagra and Jiaganj. 99% of ivory craft production is exported. In more recent years sandalwood etching has become more popular than ivory carving. Bell metal and Brass utensils are manufactured in large quantities at Khagra, Berhampore, Kandi and Jangipur. Beedi making has flourished in the Jangipur subdivision.

=== Banking ===
In 2013-14, Murshidabad-Jiaganj CD block had offices of 7 commercial banks and 1 gramin bank.

=== Backward Regions Grant Fund ===
Murshidabad district is listed as a backward region and receives financial support from the Backward Regions Grant Fund. The fund, created by the Government of India, is designed to redress regional imbalances in development. As of 2012, 272 districts across the country were listed under this scheme. The list includes 11 districts of West Bengal.

== Transport ==
Murshidabad-Jiaganj CD block has 6 ferry services and 5 originating/ terminating bus routes.

The Ranaghat-Lalgola branch line was opened in 1905. It passes through this CD Block and there are stations at Jiaganj and Murshidabad.

Baharampur-Lalgola Road and Rabindra Sarani-Siraj-ud-daulah Road pass through this block.

== Education ==
In 2013-14, Murshidabad-Jiaganj CD block had 110 primary schools with 12,409 students, 6 middle schools with 473 students, 4 high schools with 4,801 students and 10 higher secondary schools with 16,174 students. Murshidabad-Jiaganj CD block had 2 technical/ professional institutions with 194 students and 415 institutions for special and non-formal education with 18,231 students.

In Murshidabad-Jiaganj CD block, amongst the 127 inhabited villages, 26 villages did not have a school, the highest amongst all CD blocks in the district, 34 villages have more than 1 primary school, 28 villages have at least 1 primary and 1 middle school and 20 villages had at least 1 middle and 1 secondary school.

== Culture ==
Jiaganj Murshidabad CD block has two historical centres, a temple town, three palatial buildings and several historical mosques:

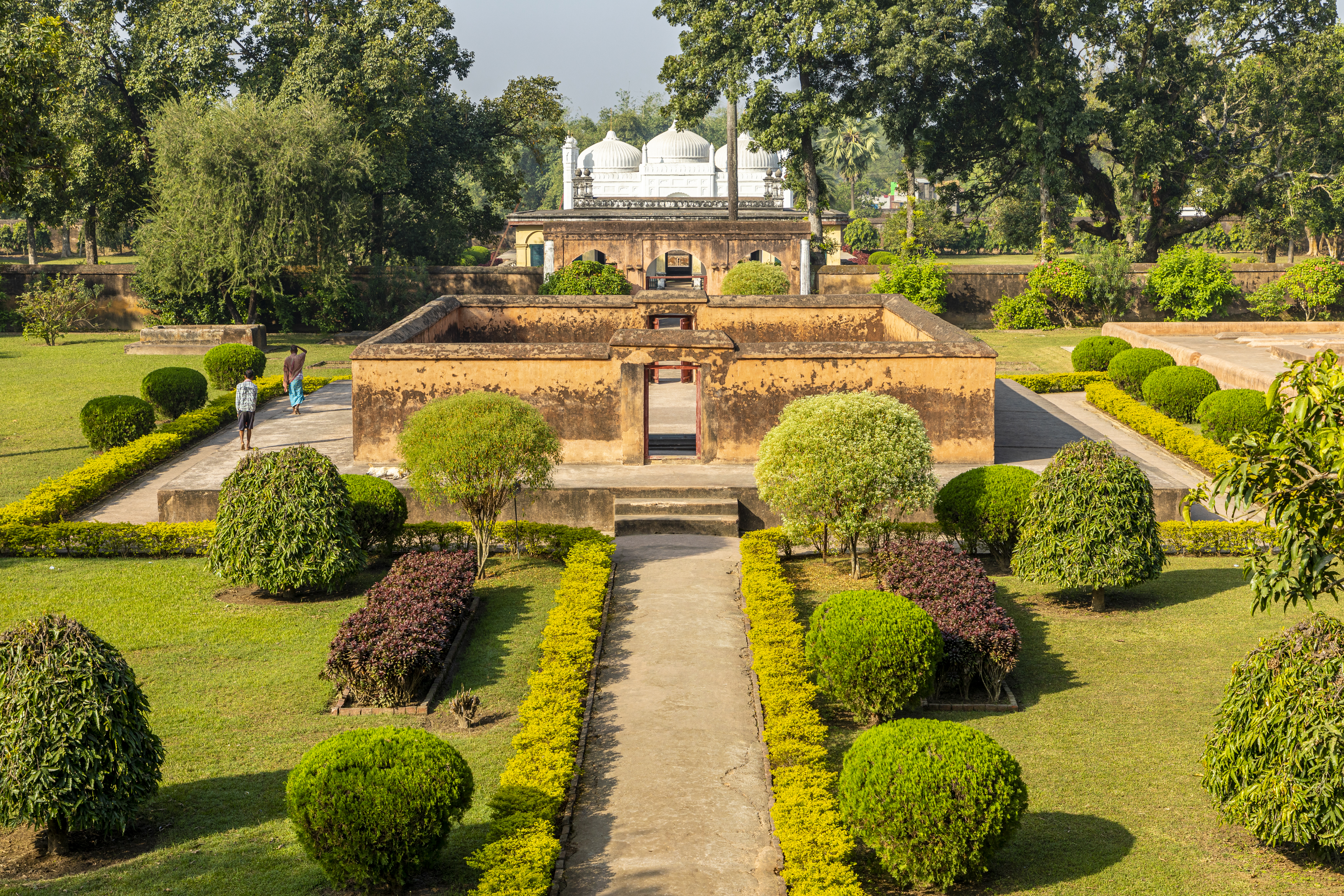
Khushbagh:The cemetery at Khusbagh hosts the graves of the Nawabs of Bengal of the Afshar dynasty and their family members. It is the resting place, amongst others, of Nawab Alivardi Khan, Nawab Siraj ud-Daula, his wife Lutfunnisa Begum, his mother Amina Begum and his maternal aunt Ghaseti Begum.

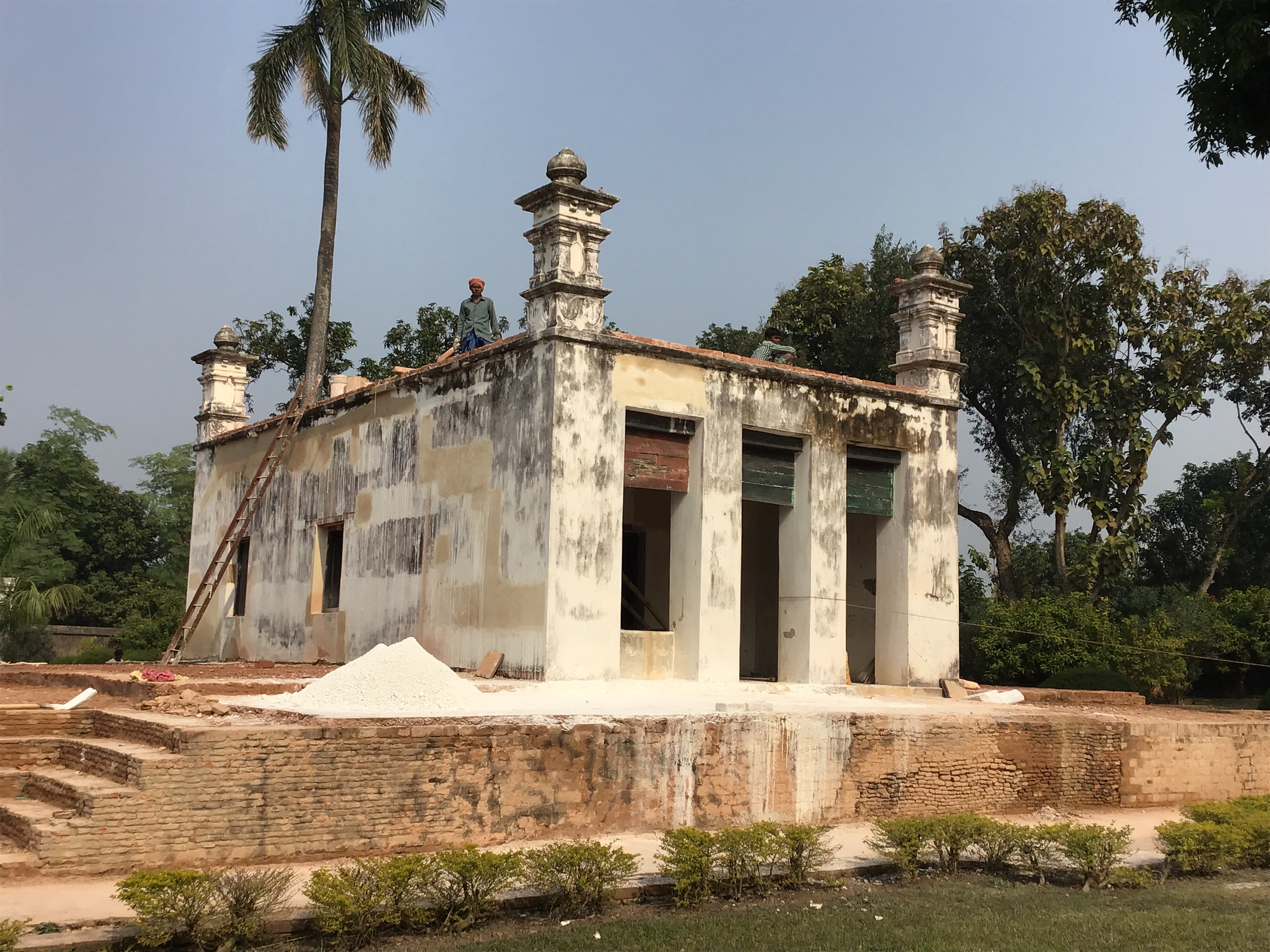
Rosnaibagh: It is the resting place of Nawab Shuja-ud-Din Muhammad Khan. It is an ASI Listed Monument.

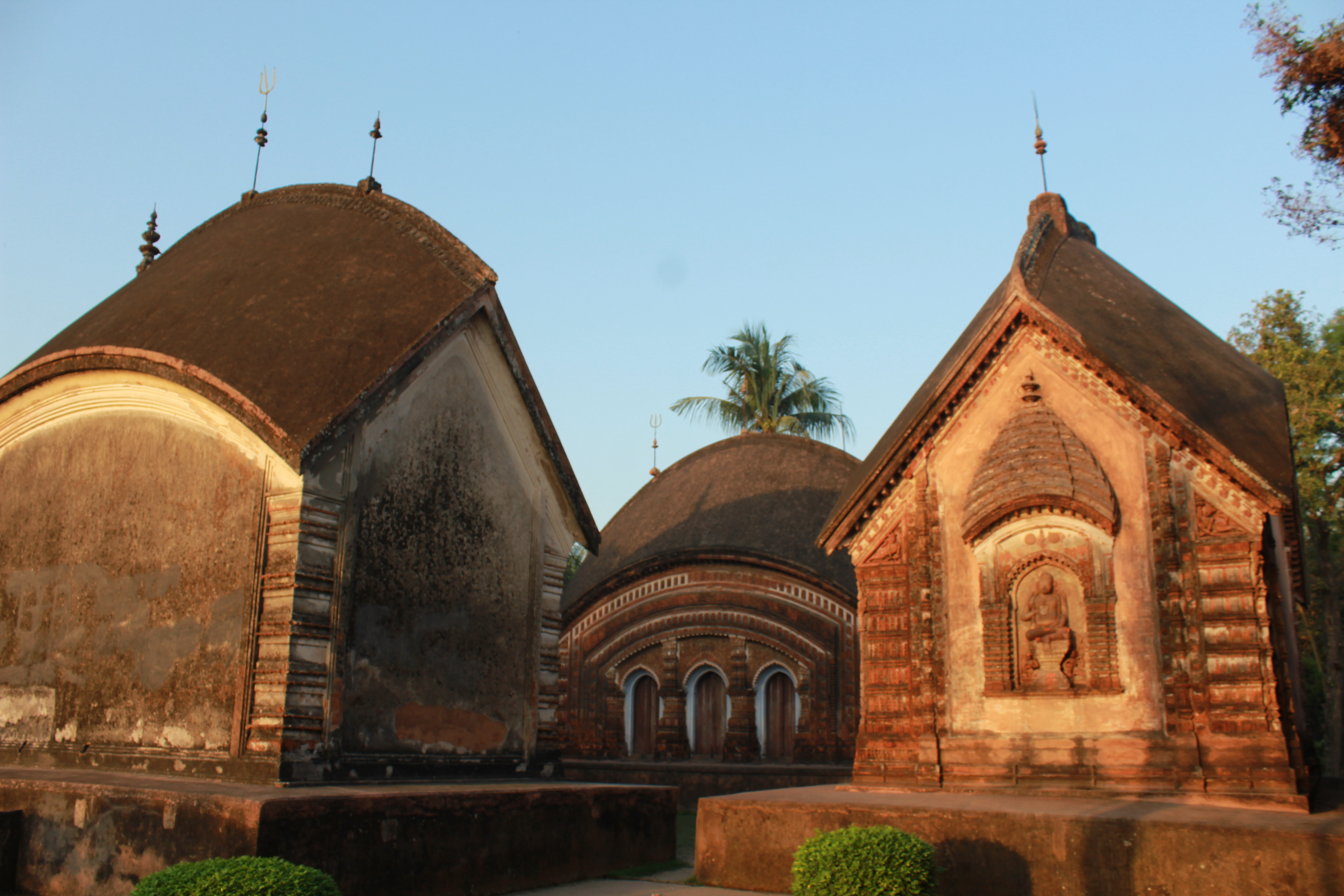
Baranagar: It has several temples built by Rani Bhabani. Of these, Char Bangla Temples (partially shown in the picture) and Bhavaniswar Mandir are ASI Listed Monuments.

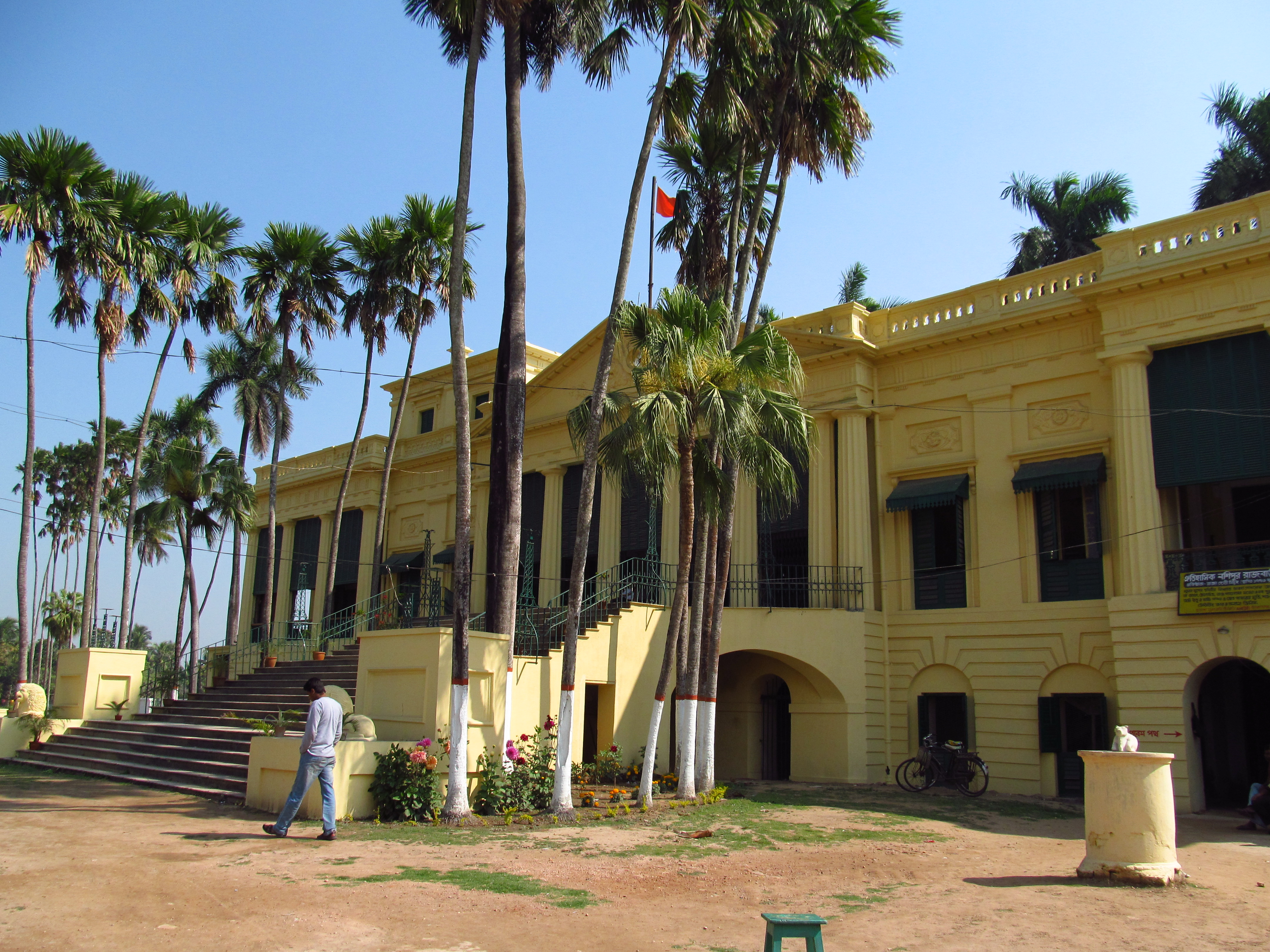
Nashipur: The current Rajbari was built by Raja Kirti Chandra Singha Bahadur in 1865, next to the old palace of Raja Debi Singha.

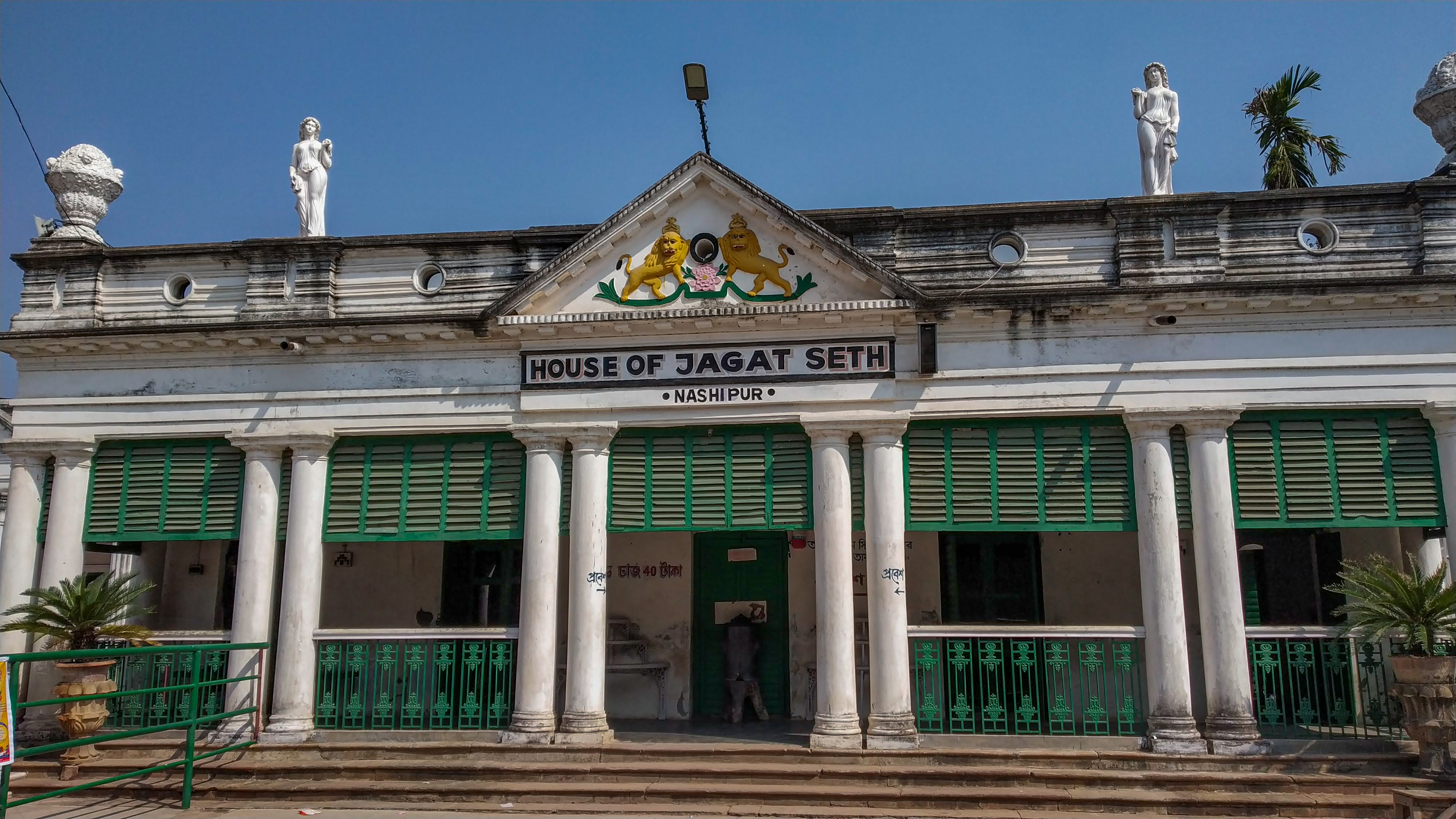
House of Jagat Seth : It was built in 1704. In 1715, Manik Chand, was conferred the title of Nagar Seth, the banker of the city, and Fateh Chand, was given the hereditary title of Jagat Seth, in 1723, by the Mughal emperors of their time. It is now a museum.

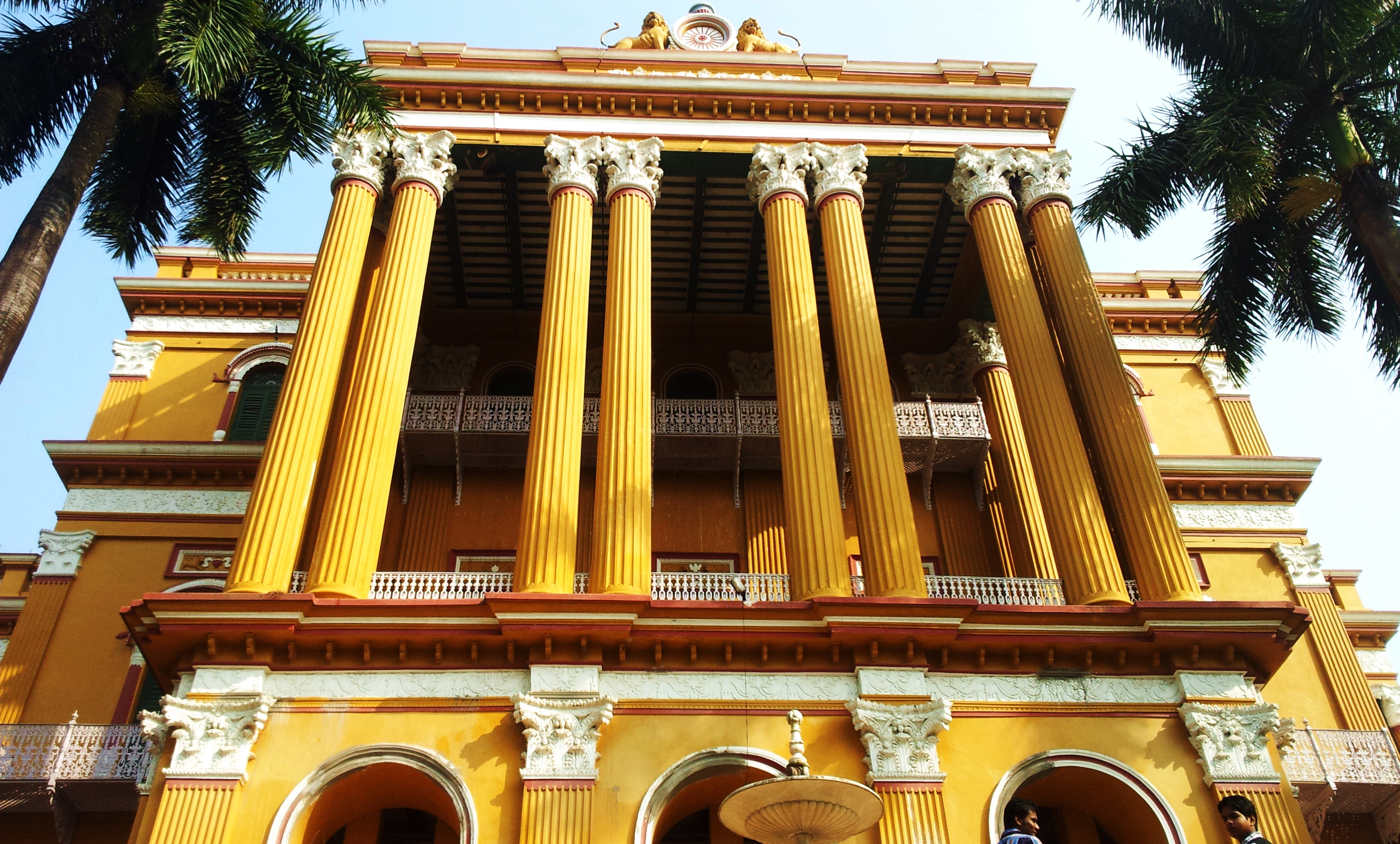
Kathgola Palace : The palace and garden at Kathgola were built by Dhanpat Singh Dugar and Lakshmipat Singh Dugar in 1873. It is now a museum.

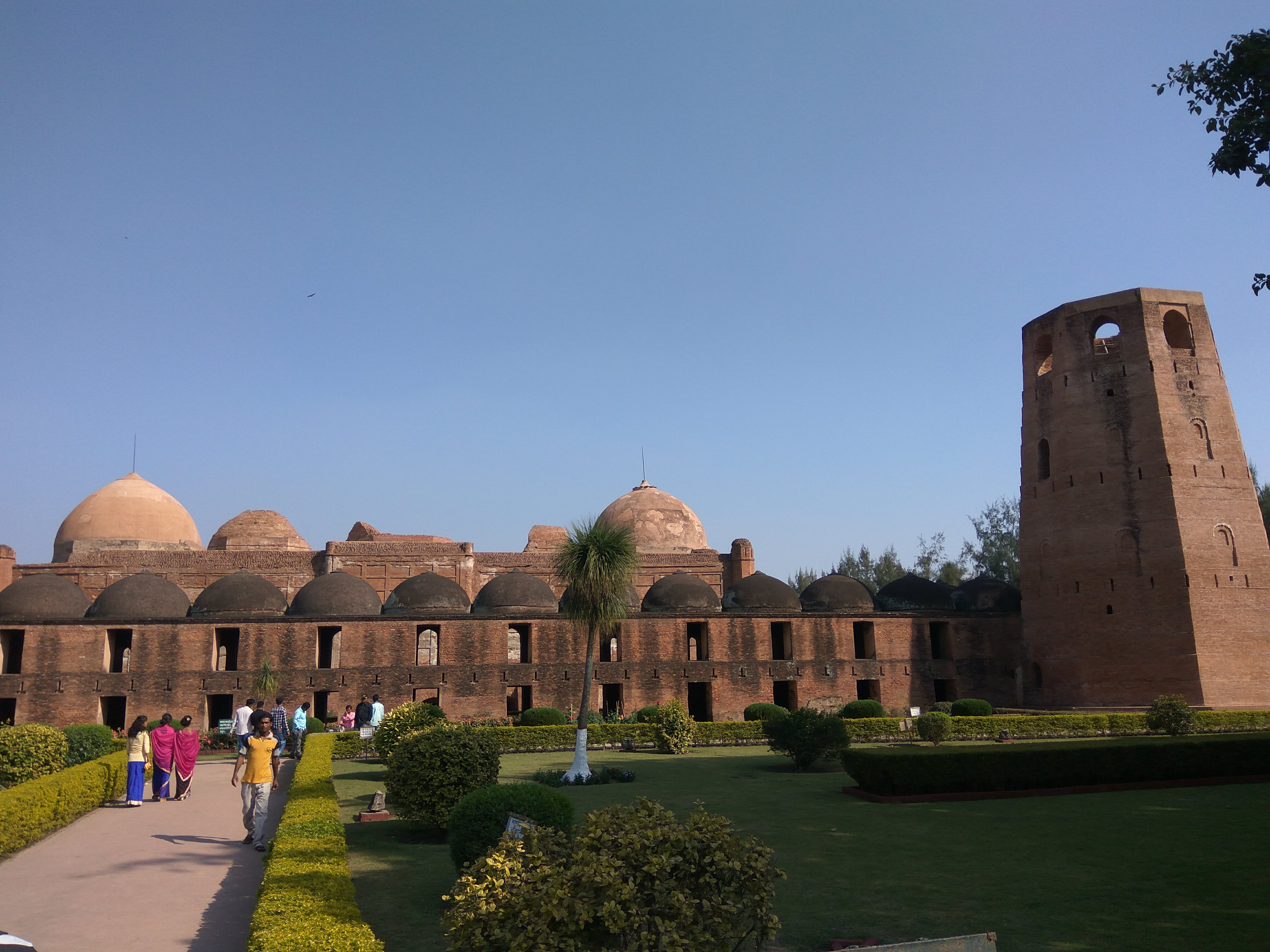
Katra Masjid: Built by Nawab Murshid Quli Khan in 1723-24, the Nawab’s tomb is located adjacent to the mosque. It is an ASI Listed Monument.

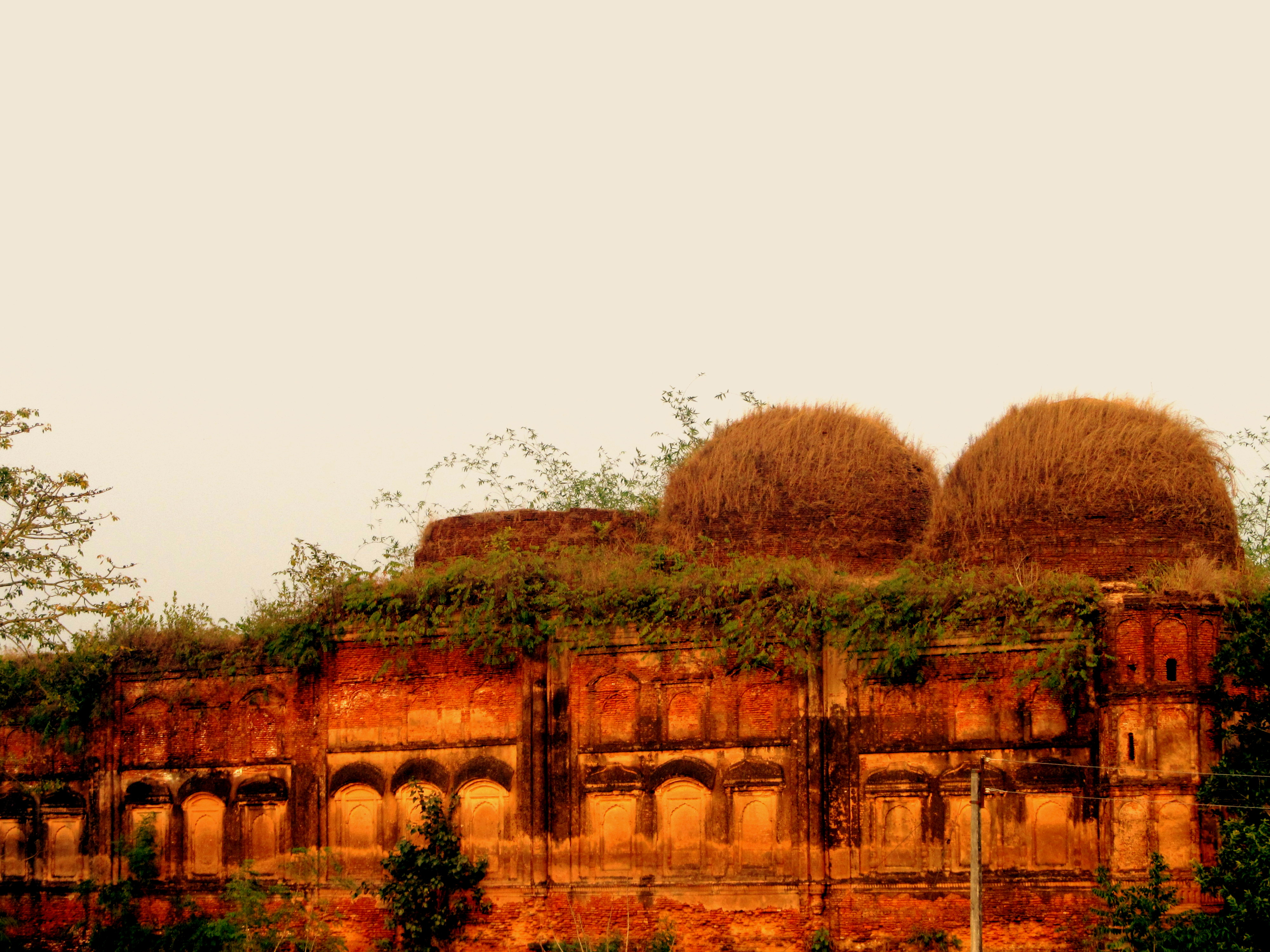
Fauti Masjid: Built by Nawab Sarfaraz Khan in 1740, it remains an unfinished construction.

Jama Masjid, Motijheel: Located on the western bank of Motijhil, it was built by Nawab Nawaei Muhammad Khan in 1750. It is an ASI Listed Monument

== Healthcare ==
In 2014, Murshidabad-Jiaganj CD block had 2 primary health centres, 1 Government of India/ central PSU medical unit and 1 private nursing home with total 8 beds and 3 doctors (excluding private bodies). It had 29 family welfare subcentres. 96,835 patients were treated outdoor in the hospitals, health centres and subcentres of the CD block.

Murshidabad-Jiaganj CD block has Jiaganj Rural Hospital at Jiaganj (with 30 beds), Azimganj Primary Health Centre (with 15 beds), Dangapra PHC at Hasanpur (with 4 beds) and Lalkuthi PHC at Dahapara (with 4 beds).

Murshidabad-Jiaganj CD block is one of the areas of Murshidabad district where ground water is affected by a high level of arsenic contamination. The WHO guideline for arsenic in drinking water is 10 mg/ litre, and the Indian Standard value is 50 mg/ litre. All but one of the 26 blocks of Murshidabad district have arsenic contamination above the WHO level, all but two of the blocks have arsenic concentration above the Indian Standard value and 17 blocks have arsenic concentration above 300 mg/litre. The maximum concentration in Murshidabad-Jiagnj CD block is 286 mg/litre.
