= Fauti Mosque =

Former mosque in Kumarpur, Murshidabad, West Bengal, India

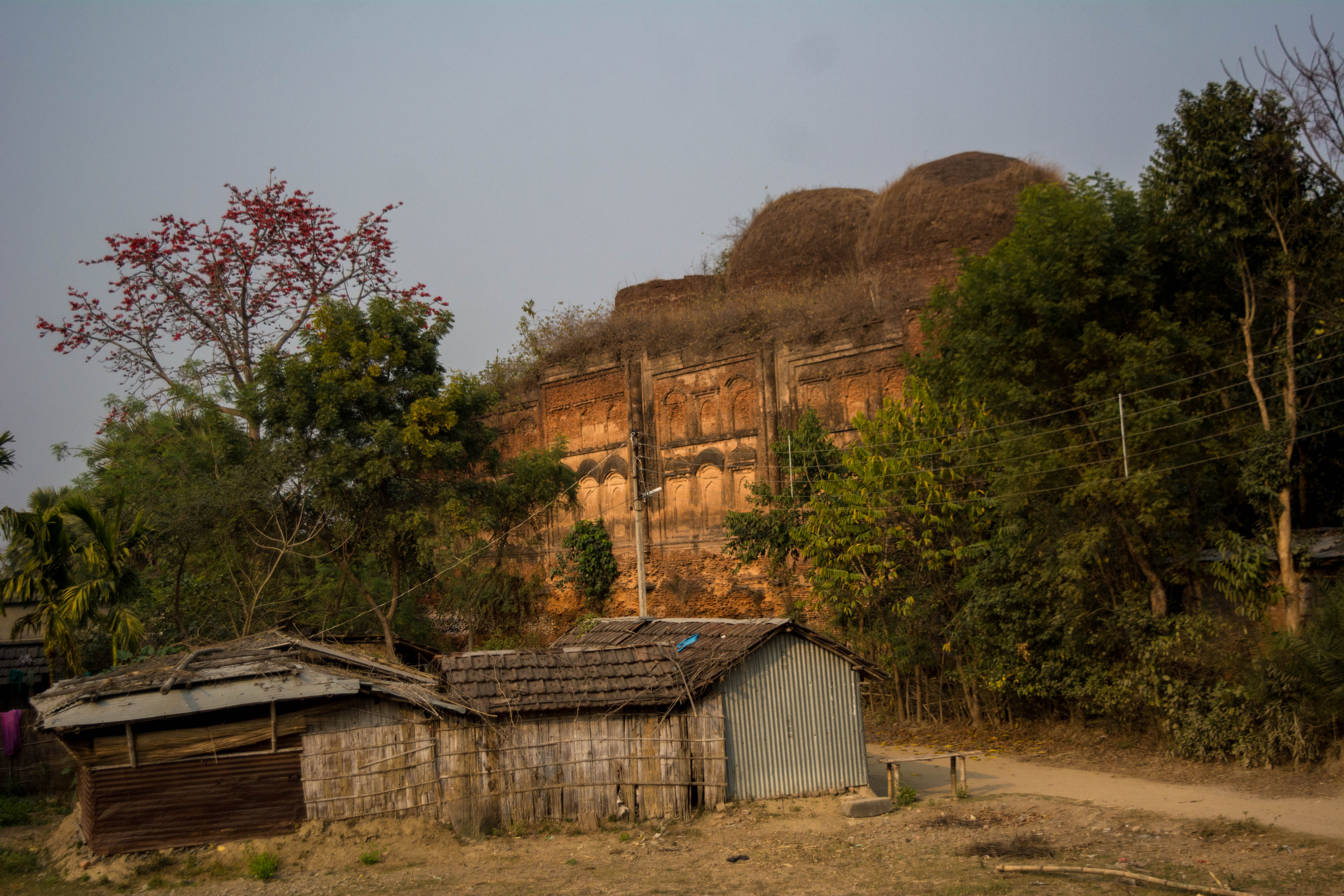
- Overgrown grounds of the former mosque

- Location of the former mosque in West Bengal

Religion
- Affiliation: Islam (former)
- Ecclesiastical or organisational status: Mosque (former)
- Status: Abandoned; (ruinous state)

Location
- Location: Kumarpur, Murshidabad district, West Bengal
- Country: India
- Coordinates: 24°11′09″N 88°16′50″E

Architecture
- Type: Mosque architecture
- Style: Indo-Islamic
- Founder: Nawab Sarfaraz Khan
- Completed: 1740 CE

Specifications
- Length: 41 m (135 ft)
- Width: 12 m (38 ft)
- Dome: Five

The Fauti Mosque, also known as the Phuti Mosque, is a former mosque in a ruinous state, located at Kumarpur in the Murshidabad-Jiaganj CD block in the Lalbag subdivision of Murshidabad district, in the state of West Bengal, India.The old Fauti Mosque was approximately 1.2 kilometres (0.75 mi) from the Hazarduari Palace.

Hazarduari Palace and its associated sites in the Kila Nizamat area are a major centre of attraction in Murshidabad. Just a little away are Katra Masjid, Fauti Mosque, Jama Masjid and the Motijhil area. There is a group of attractions in the northern part of the town. Some attractions such as Khushbagh, Rosnaiganj, Baranagar, Kiriteswari Temple, Karnasuvarna and others are on the other side of the river and there are attractions in the neighbouring Berhampore area.

Contained within the mosque grounds is the Tomb of Nawab Sarfraz Khan at Naginabagh, a State Protected Monument.

== History ==
Before completion of the mosque the Nawab died or became 'Faut' in a battle with Nawab Alivardi Khan. Hence, the people renamed it as Fauti Mosque.

== Gallery ==
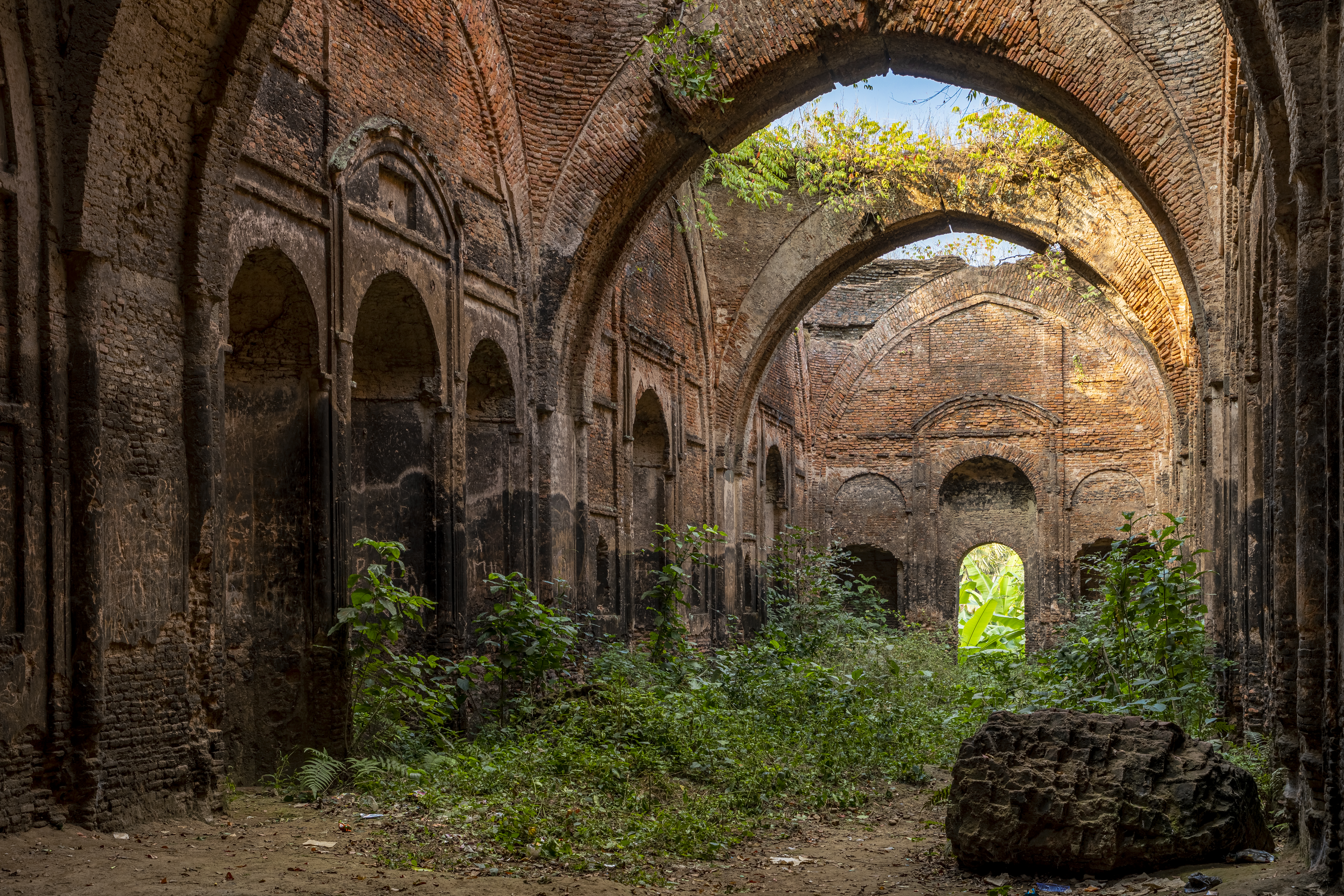
The mosque interior

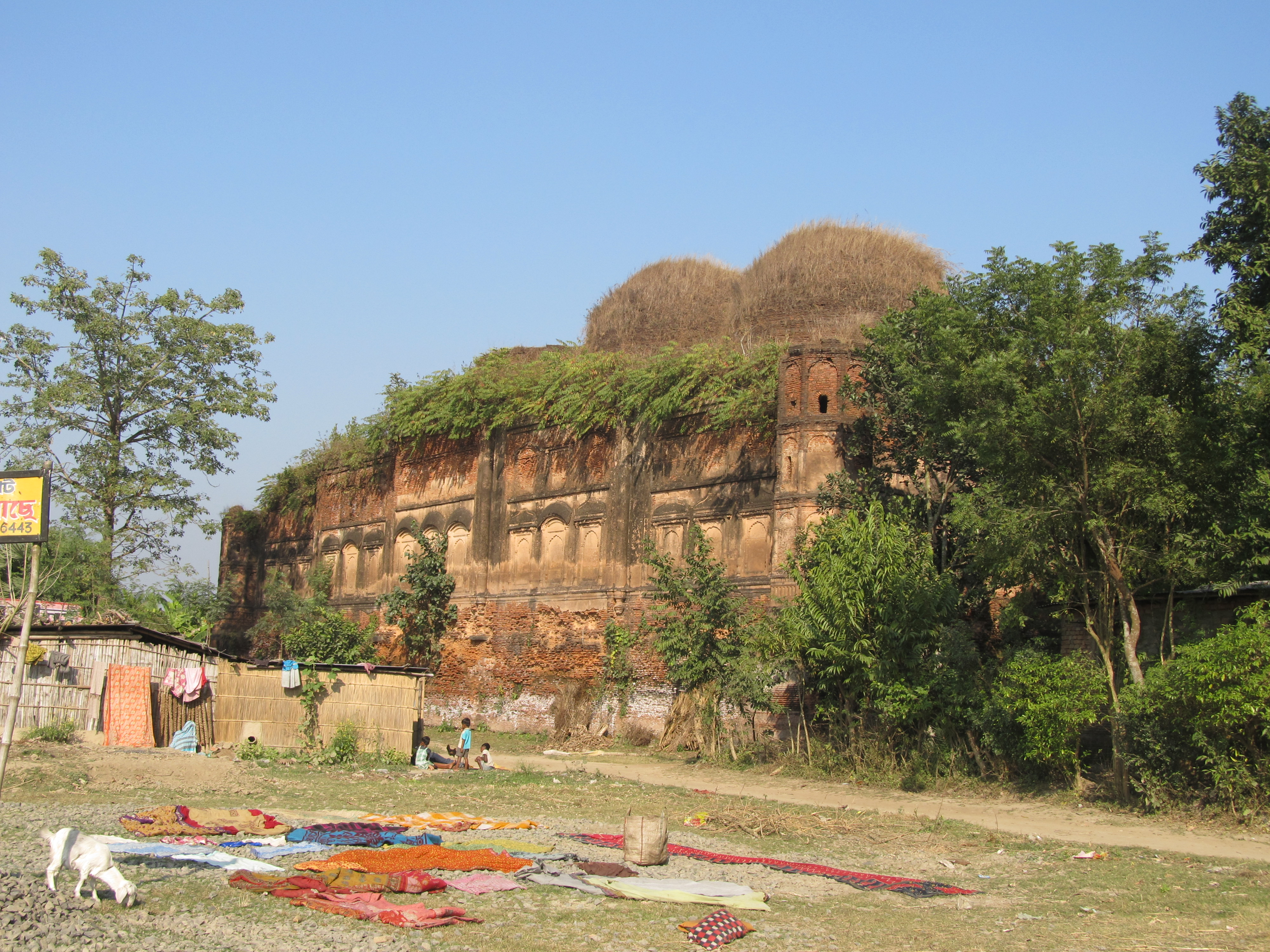
Ruins of the mosque

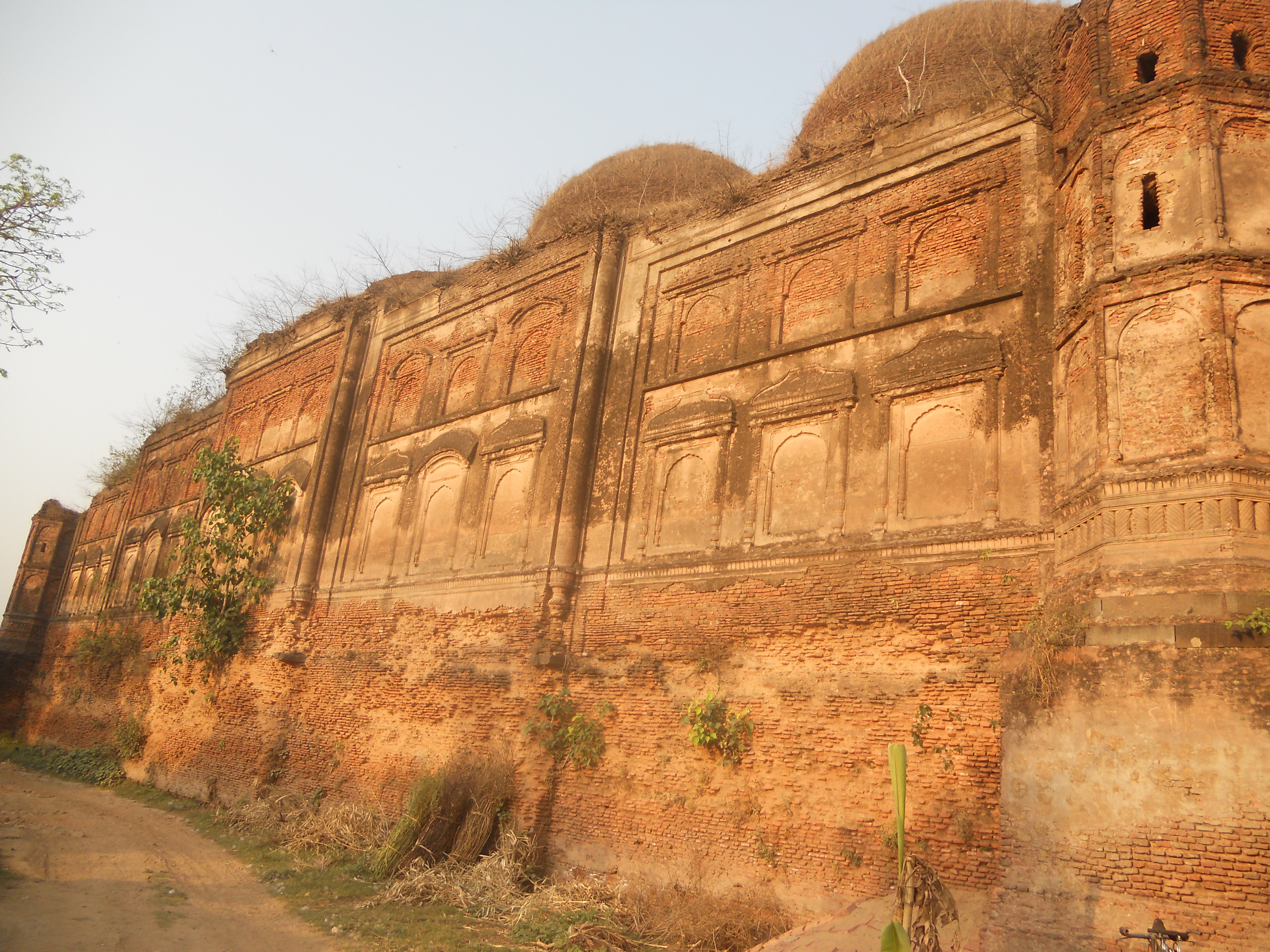
Ruins of the mosque

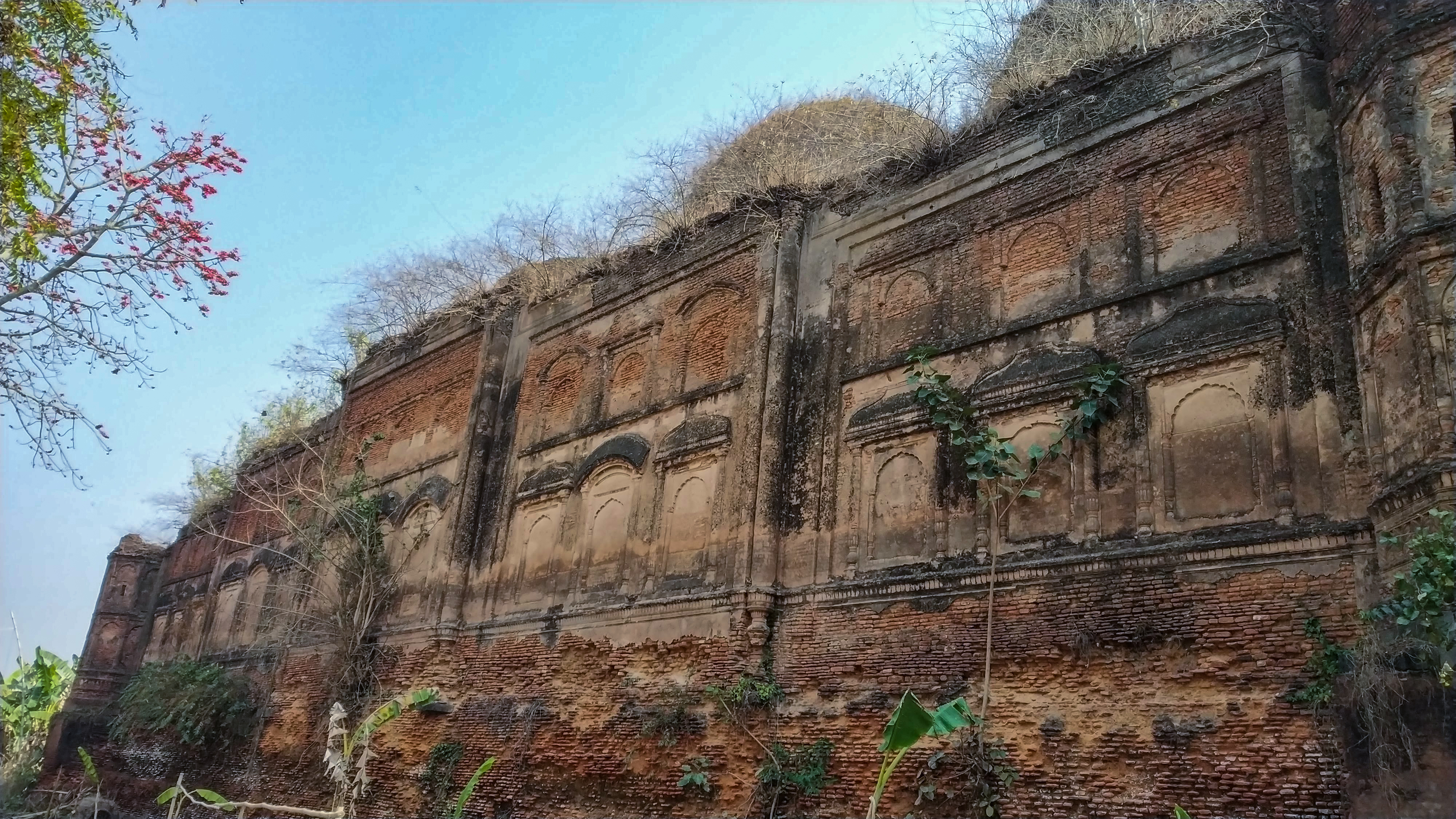
Ruins of the mosque

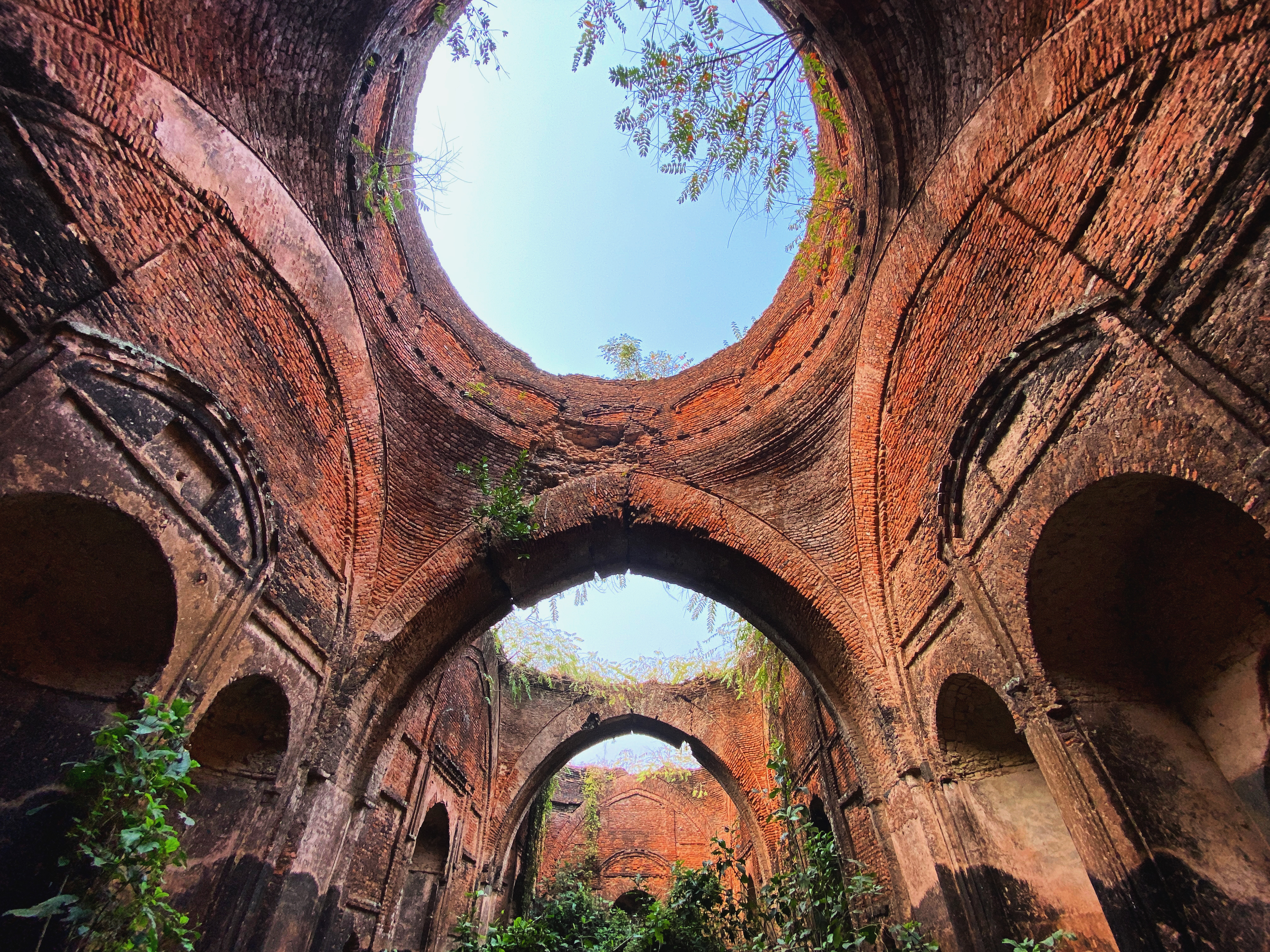
Looking through a dome from inside the mosque

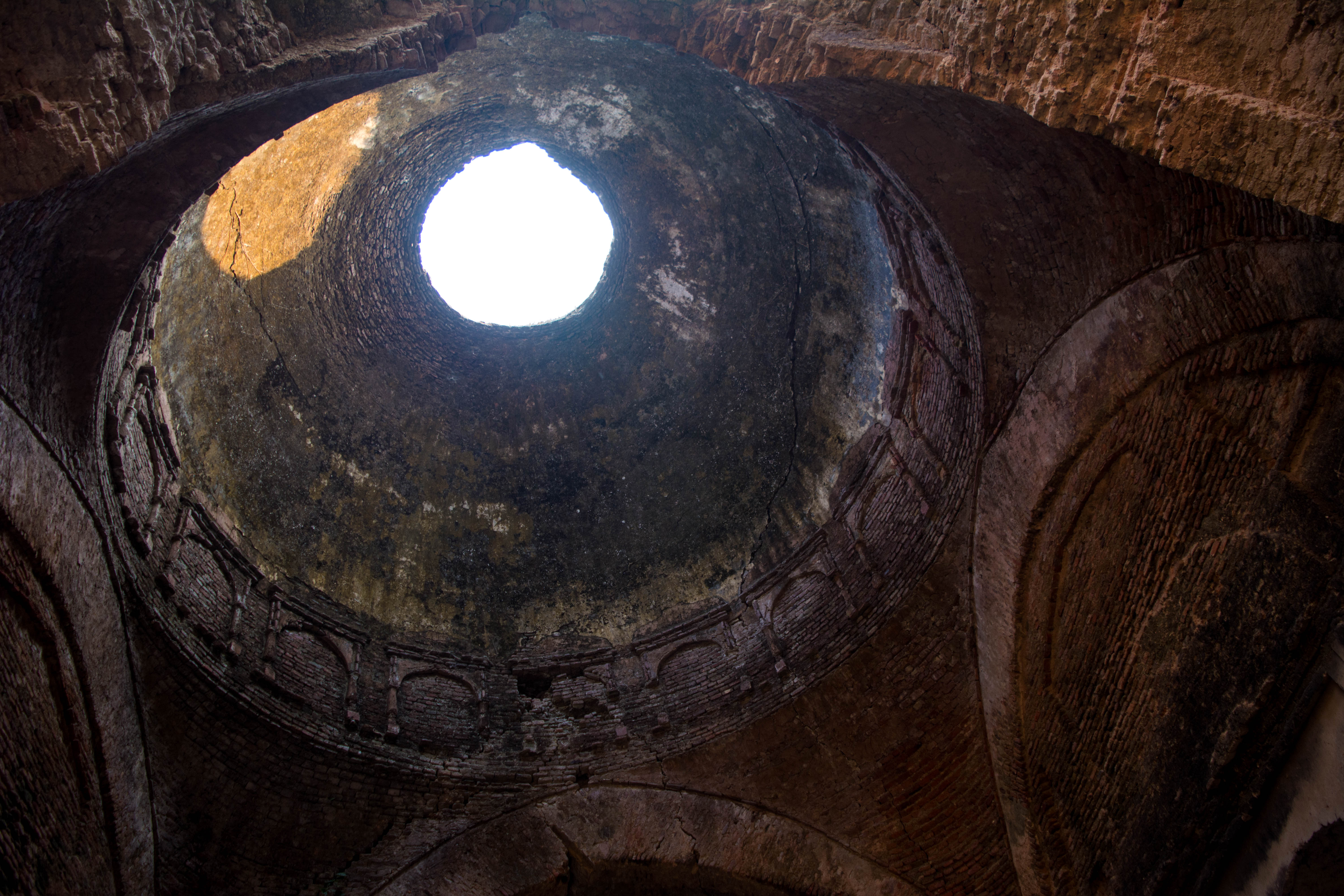
Looking through a dome from inside the mosque

== See also ==
- Islam in India
- List of mosques in India
- List of State Protected Monuments in West Bengal
- Nawabs of Bengal and Murshidabad
