= Jama Masjid, Motijheel =

Mosque in Murshidabad, West Bengal, India

Jama Masjid
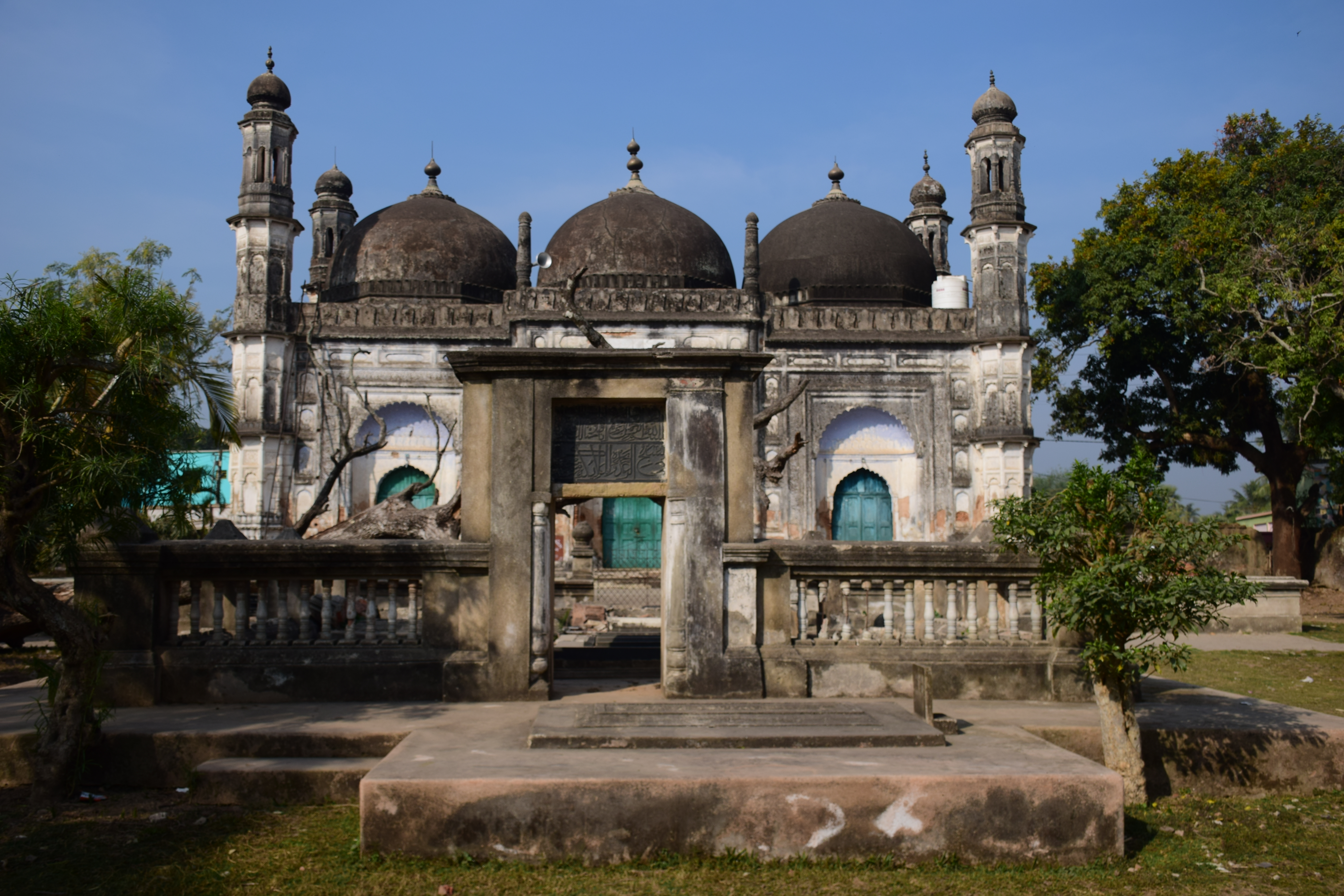
- The mosque, in 2019

- Location of the mosque in West Bengal

Religion
- Affiliation: Islam
- Ecclesiastical or organizational status: Friday mosque
- Status: Active

Location
- Location: Motijhil, Murshidabad, West Bengal
- Country: India
- Interactive map of Jama Masjid
- Administration: Archaeological Survey of India
- Coordinates: 24°09′44″N 88°16′32″E

Architecture
- Type: Mosque architecture
- Style: Indo-Islamic
- Founder: Nawab Nawaei Muhammad Khan
- Completed: c. 1750 CE

Specifications
- Dome: Three
- Minaret: Four

Monument of National Importance
- Official name: Motijheel Jama Mosque
- Reference no.: N-WB-129

The Jama Masjid, also known as the Kala Masjid and as the Motijheel Mosque, is a Friday mosque, located on the western bank of Motijhil, in the historical city of Murshidabad, in the state of West Bengal, India. The Jama Masjid was built by Nawajish Muhammad Khan in c. 1750 CE.

Hazarduari Palace and its associated sites in the Kila Nizamat area are a major centre of attraction in Murshidabad. Just a little away are Katra Masjid, Fauti Mosque, Jama Masjid and the Motijhil area. There is a group of attractions in the northern part of the town. Some attractions such as Khushbagh, Rosnaiganj, Baranagar, Kiriteswari Temple, Karnasuvarna and others are on the other side of the river and there are attractions in the neighbouring Berhampore area.

The Motijheel Jama Mosque is a Monuments of National Importance, managed by the Archaeological Survey of India.

== History ==
Jama Masjid was built by Nawab Nawaei Muhammad Khan in 1750 CE. He named it Kala Masjid and is also well known as Motijheel Mosque.

Ghaseti Begum, the eldest daughter of Nawab Alivardi Khan, adopted Ekramulla, the son of her younger sister Amina Begum and the younger brother of Siraj ud-Daulah, and brought him up as her own son. Ekramulla died at a young age. Ghaseti Begum's husband, Nawaei Muhammad Khan, could not bear the shock and died. Both of them were buried in the Jama Masjid compound. It is said that Nawab Alivardi Khan used to come regularly to the Jama Masjid to offer prayers.

== Architecture ==
The Jama Masjid has three domes and a three-arched façade. Banglapedia describes the mosque as being rectangular in plan and covered by three hemispherical domes. Octagonal minarets capped by bulbuous kiosks are situated in the four corners.

== Gallery ==
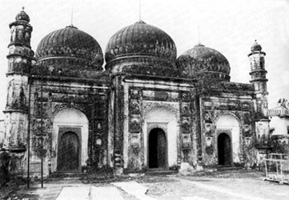
A picture of the mosque, in 1801, by C.B.Asher

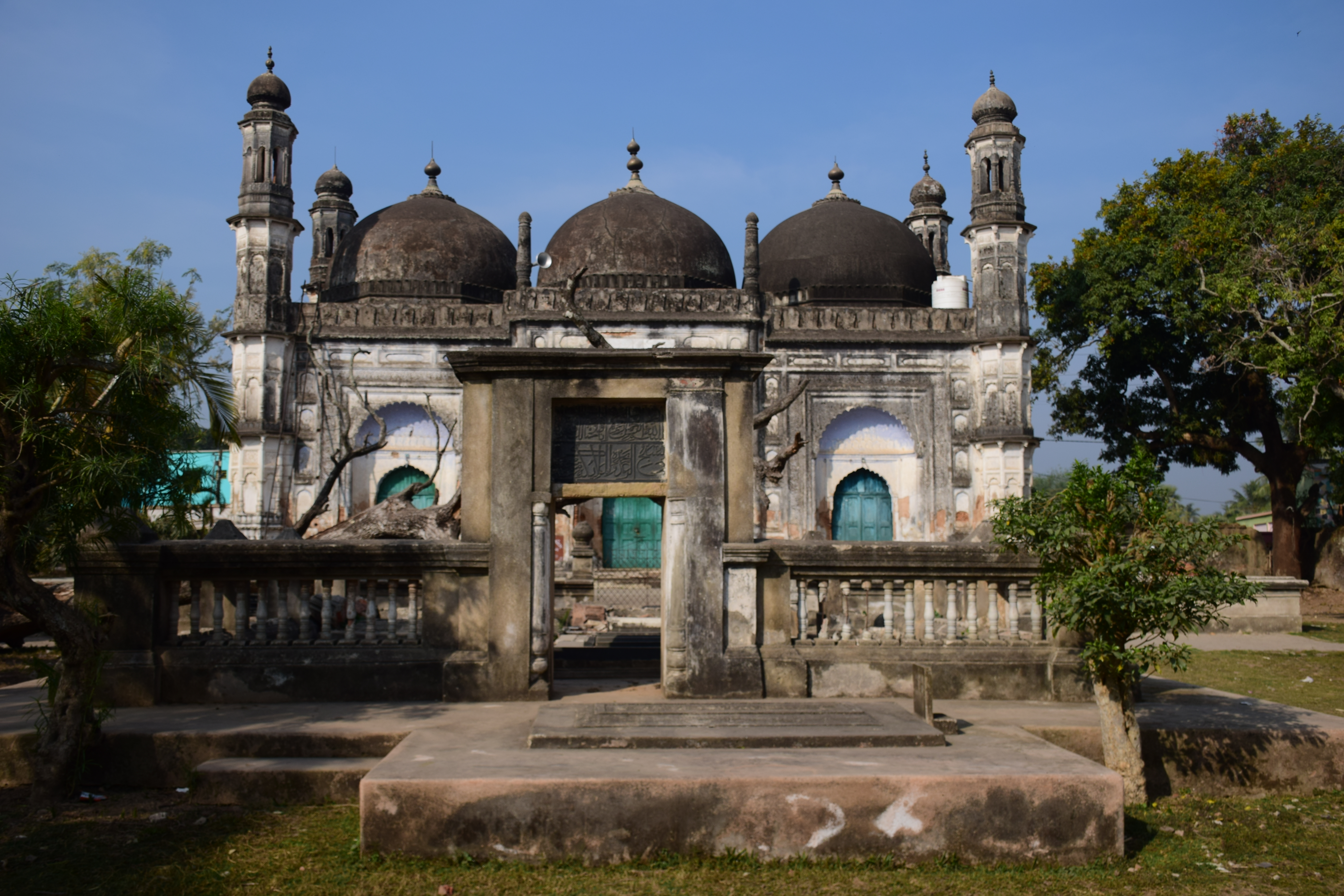
Jama Masjid

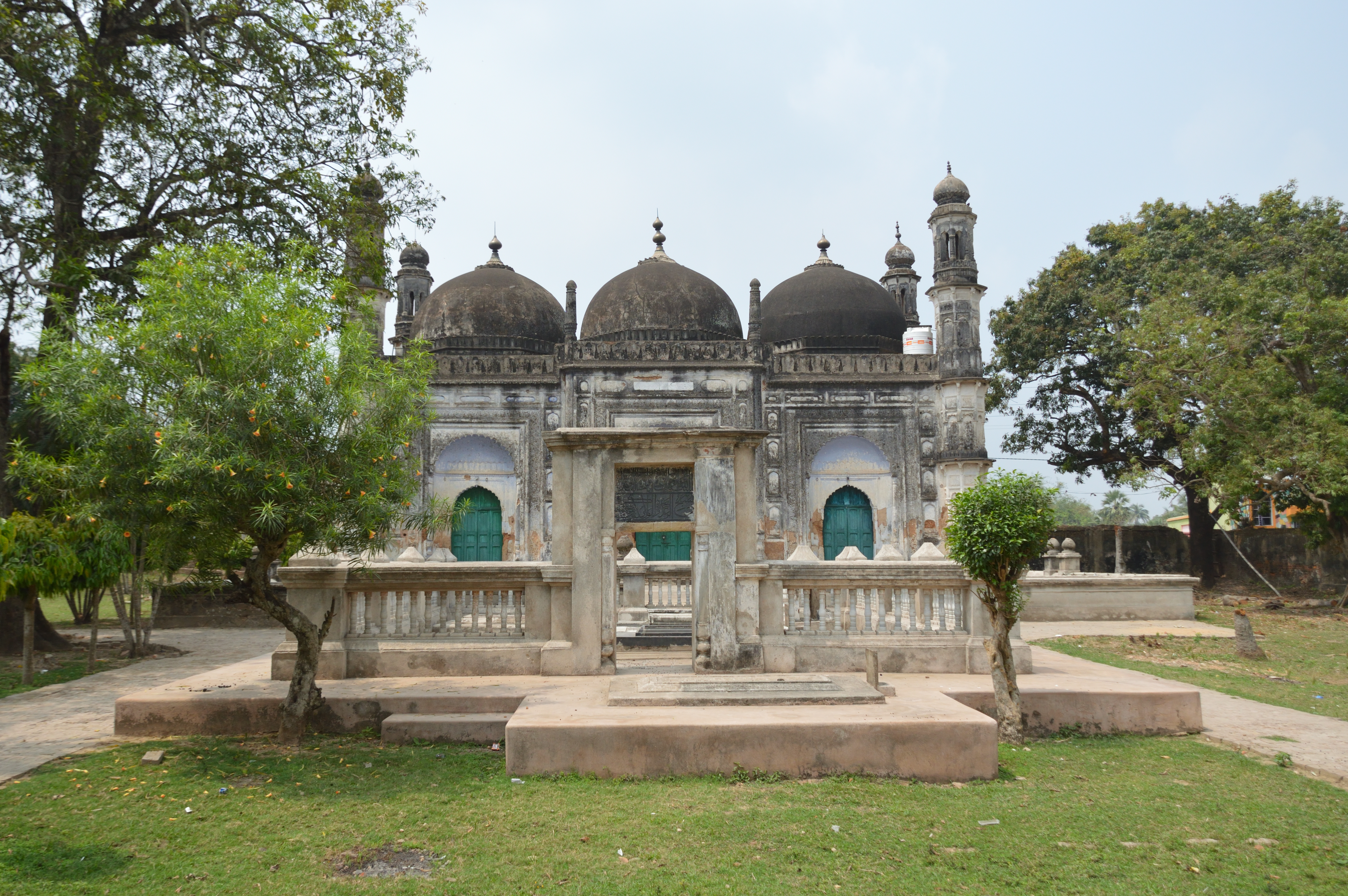
The mosque in 2017

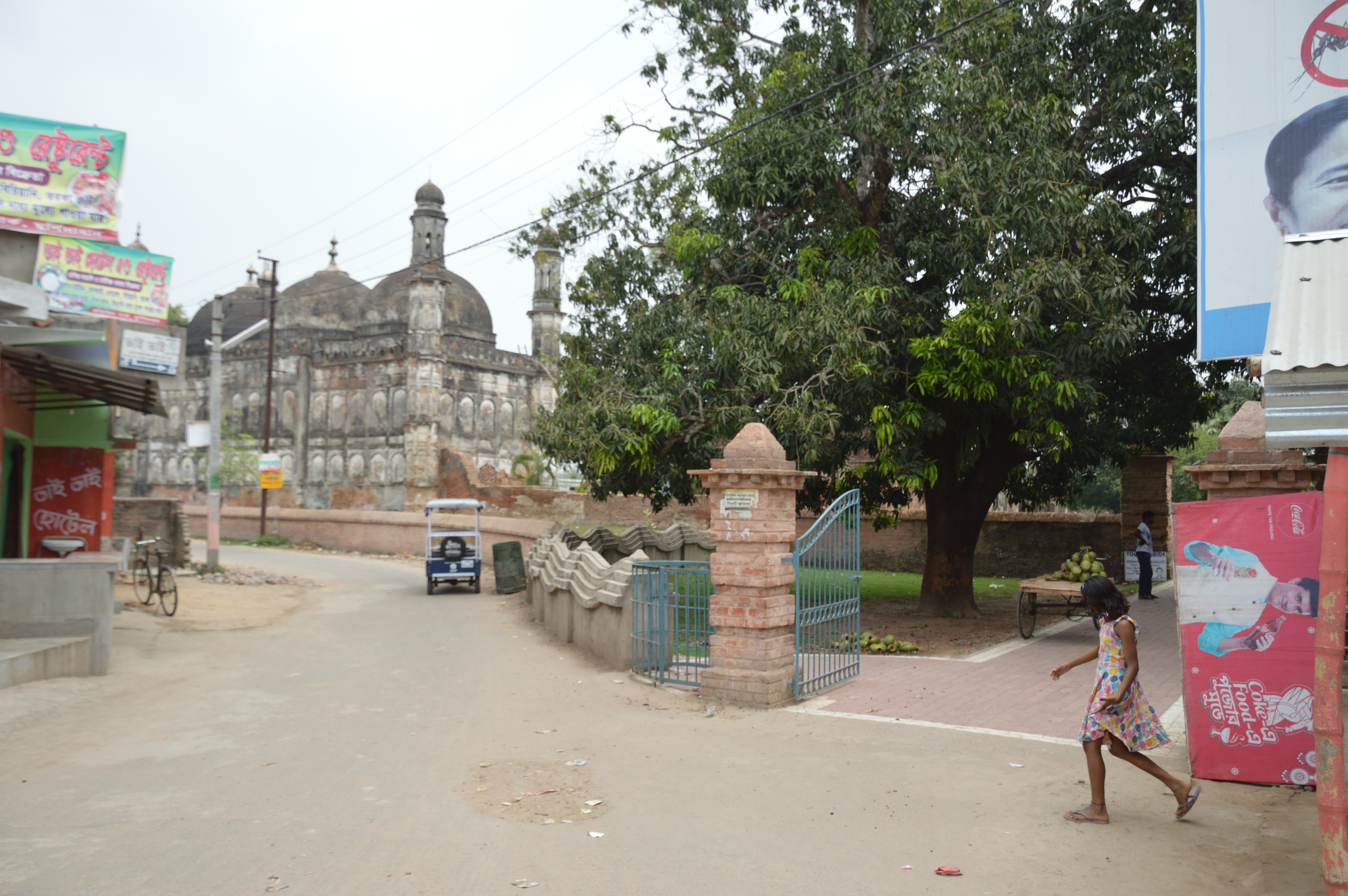
Area surrounding the mosque in 2017

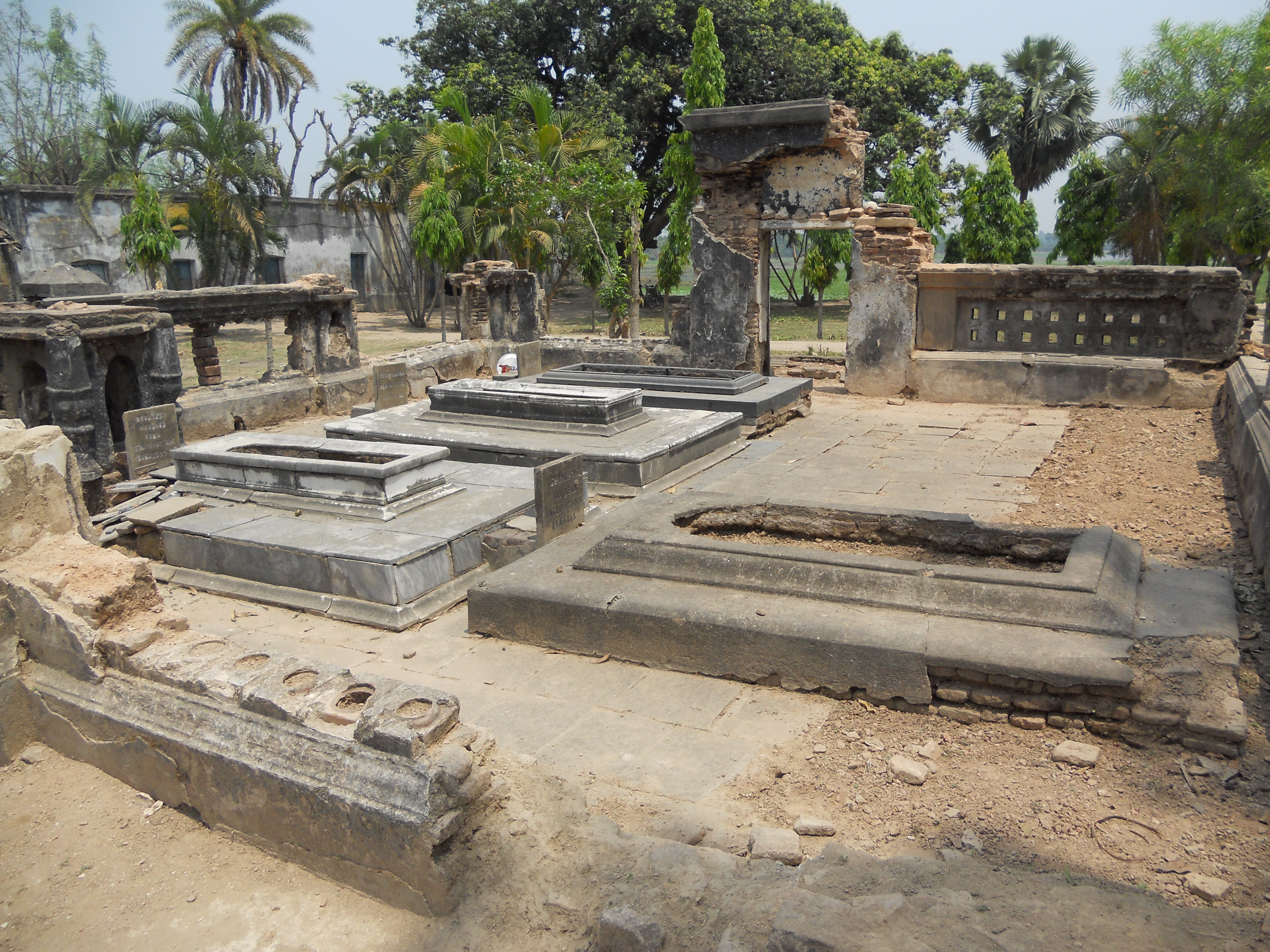
Graves of Nawarish Muhammad Khan, Ekramulla and others

== See also ==
- Islam in India
- List of mosques in India
- List of Monuments of National Importance in West Bengal
- Nawabs of Bengal and Murshidabad
