= Katra Masjid =

Former caravanserai, mosque and tomb in Murshidabad, West Bengal, India

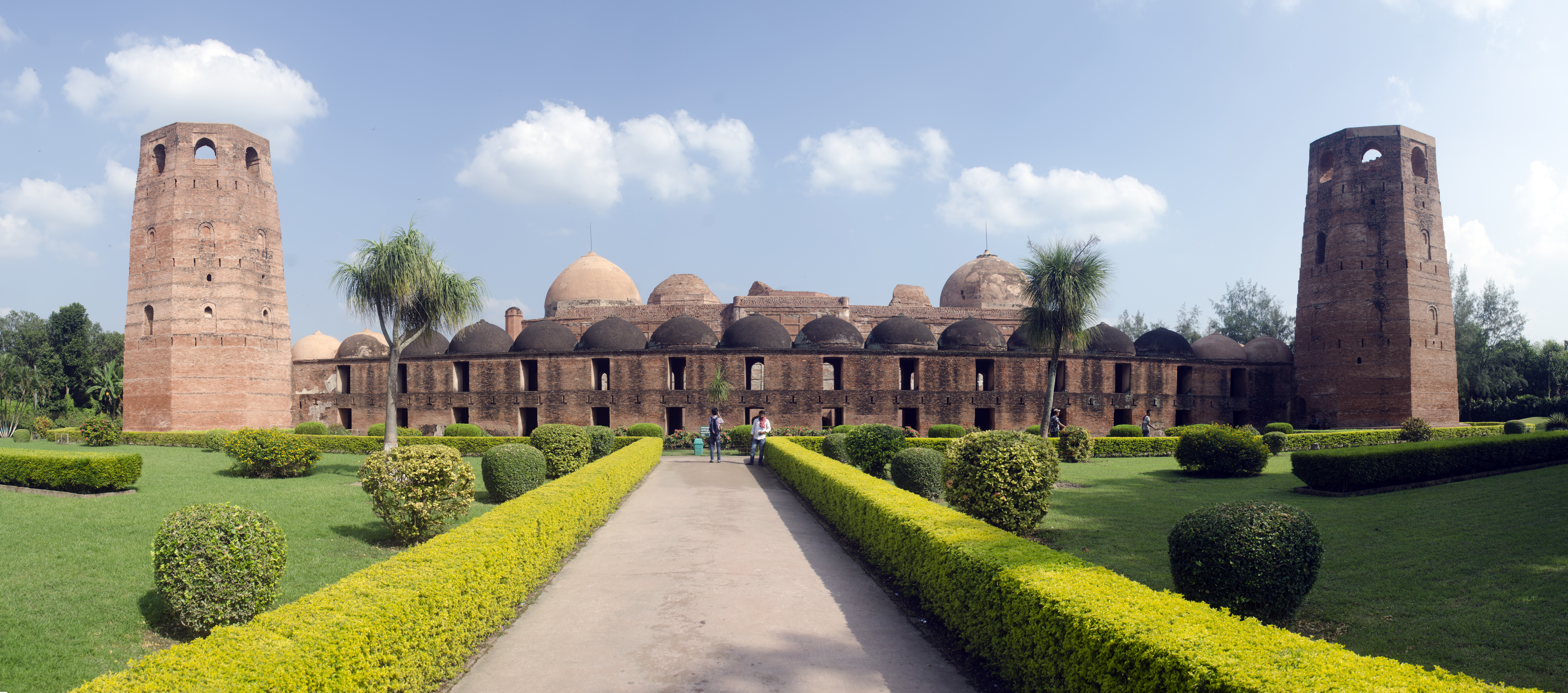
- The former caravanserai and mosque, in 2017

- Location of the former caravanserai and mosque in West Bengal

Religion
- Affiliation: Shia Islam (former)
- Ecclesiastical or organisational status: Caravanserai, mosque and tomb
- Ownership: Government of West Bengal
- Status: Inactive; (in partial ruins)

Location
- Location: Murshidabad, West Bengal
- Country: India
- Administration: Archaeological Survey of India
- Coordinates: 24°11′05″N 88°17′17″E

Architecture
- Architect: Murad Farash Khan
- Type: Mosque architecture
- Founder: Nawab Murshid Quli Khan
- Completed: 1137 AH (1724/1725 CE)

Specifications
- Dome: Five (two destroyed)
- Minaret: Four (two destroyed)
- Minaret height: 21 m (70 ft)
- Shrine: One (Tomb of Nawab Murshid Quli Khan)
- Inscriptions: Two
- Materials: Brick; basalt

Monument of National Importance
- Official name: Tomb and Mosque of Murshid Quli Khan (also Katra Masjid)
- Reference no.: N-WB-120

The Katra Masjid is a former Shia caravanserai, mosque and tomb, in a partial ruinous state, located in the city of Murshidabad, in the state of West Bengal, India. The complex contains the tomb of its founder, Nawab Murshid Quli Khan, and is one of the largest caravanserais in the Indian subcontinent, with capacity for 700 readers at any one time. Built in 1137 AH (1724/1725 CE), when the early modern Bengal Subah was a major hub of trade in Eurasia. The structure was significantly damaged by the 1897 Indian earthquake.

The site is a Monument of National Importance

== Location ==
Hazarduari Palace and its associated sites in the Kila Nizamat area is the centre of attraction in Murshidabad. Just a little away are Katra Masjid, Fauti Mosque, Jama Masjid and the Motijhil area. There is a group of attractions in the northern part of the town. Some attractions such as Khushbagh, Rosnaiganj, Baranagar, Kiriteswari Temple, Karnasuvarna and others are on the other side of the river and there are attractions in the neighbouring Berhampore area also.

== Architecture ==
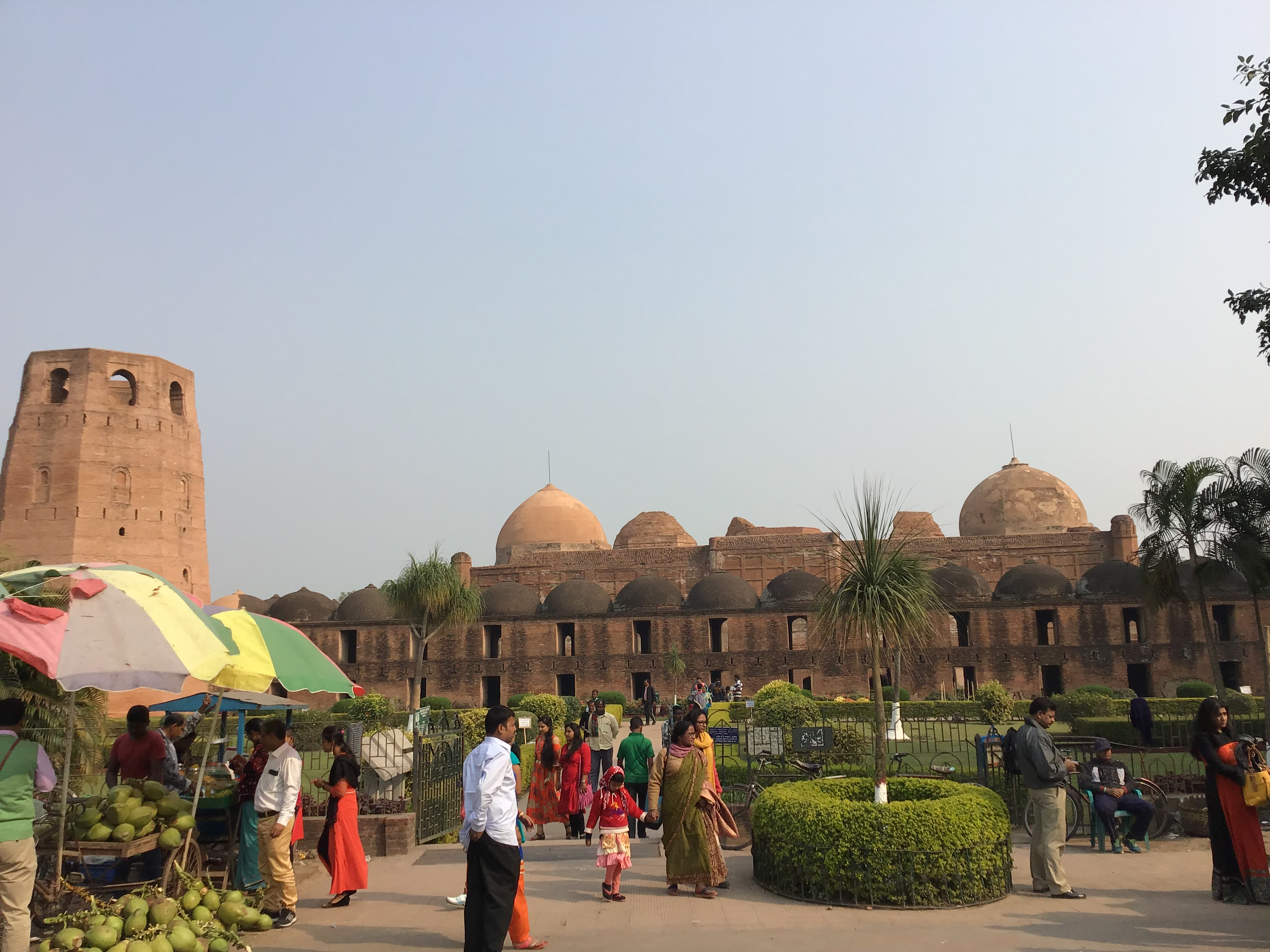
Katra Masjid

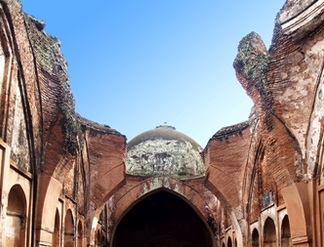
A dome, destroyed in the 1897 earthquake

The former mosque is reportedly a copy of the Kartalab Khan Mosque in Dhaka.

Four large minars stood at the four corners, of which two have since been partially destroyed. These are several arches. They had bulbous domes, also destroyed in the 1897 earthquake. In his book, Select Views of India, Hodges said the mosques were "a grand seminary of Muslim learning".

The cells are locally called Katra.

The former mosque has two inscriptions on basalt slabs, that translated from Persian, state that the mosque was constructed by Nawab Nazim Murshid Quli Khan in 1137 AH (1724/1725 CE).'

=== Tomb ===
The eastern entrance to the mosque is by a flight of fourteen stairs. Nawab Murshid Quli Khan was buried under these stairs. He was buried under the stairs in 1725 CE.

== Communal uprising ==
The mosque has been protected and maintained by the ASI since 1910, used only as a centre for scholarly pursuits. At the 1987 election, the Muslim League was successful in gaining a seat in the West Bengal Legislative Assembly on a platform of allowing constituents the right to pray at all mosques, including the Katra Masjid and another eleven mosques in West Bengal managed by the ASI. The Muslim League submitted to government authorities requests for the right to pray at Katra Masjid that were ignored, and in response, the government tightened security around the mosque. Permission for a protest march was granted to the Muslim League to gather at a village near Berhampore, some 12 kilometres (7.5 mi) from the mosque. Approximately 35,000 Muslims turned up to protest. A group of Muslims broke away from the march and clashed with local Hindus, resulting in the death of at least 12 (and possibly up to 21) unarmed Muslims in Cossimbazar. The Muslim League blamed the state government authorities, "Either the Government must allow us to pray at Katra Masjid or scrap the right to religion from the Constitution."

== Gallery ==
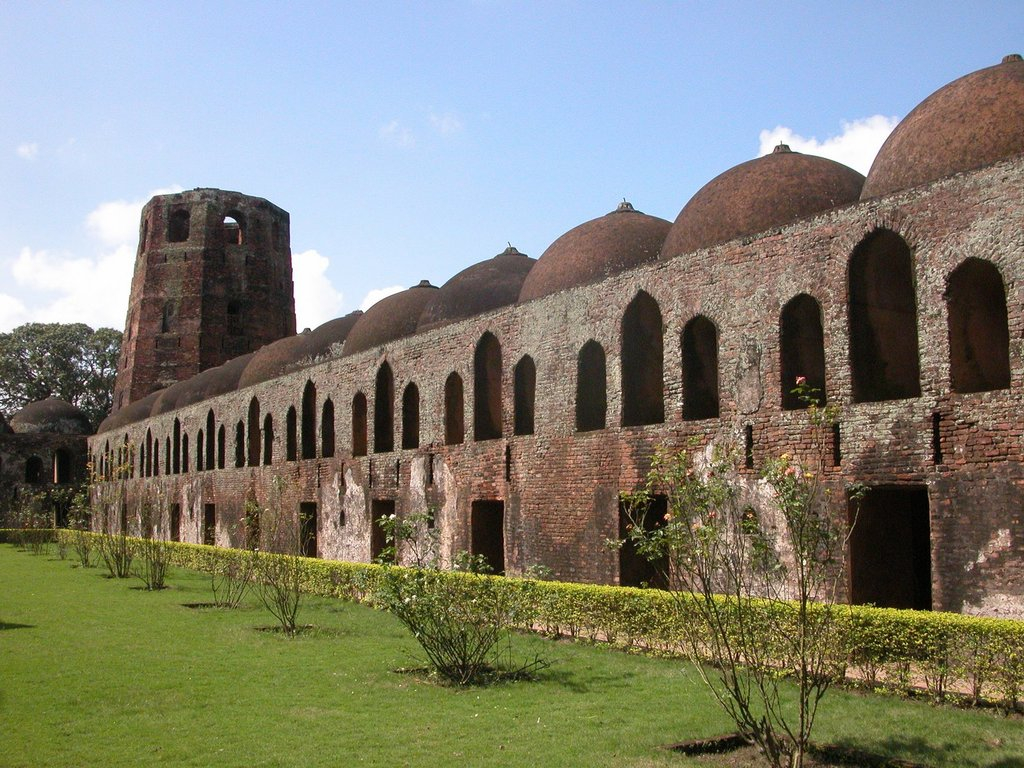
The mosque

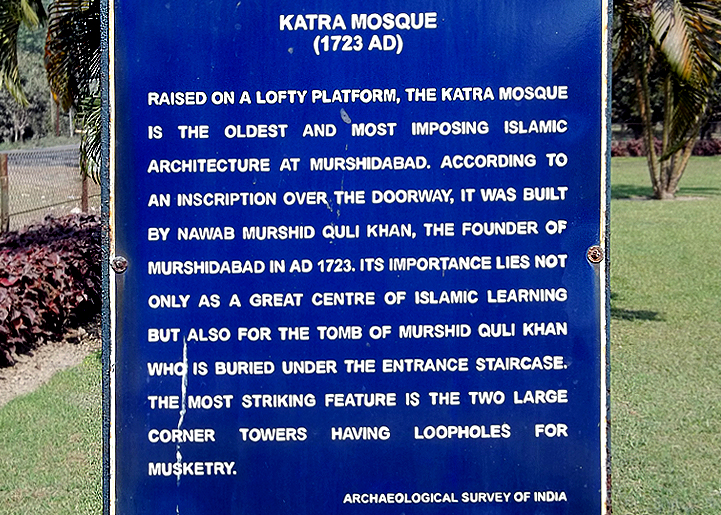
Katra Mosque plaque by the ASI

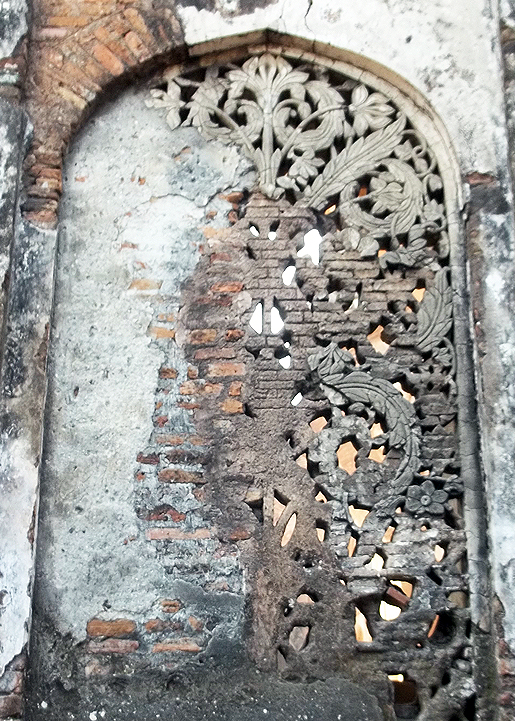
Mosque ventilation window

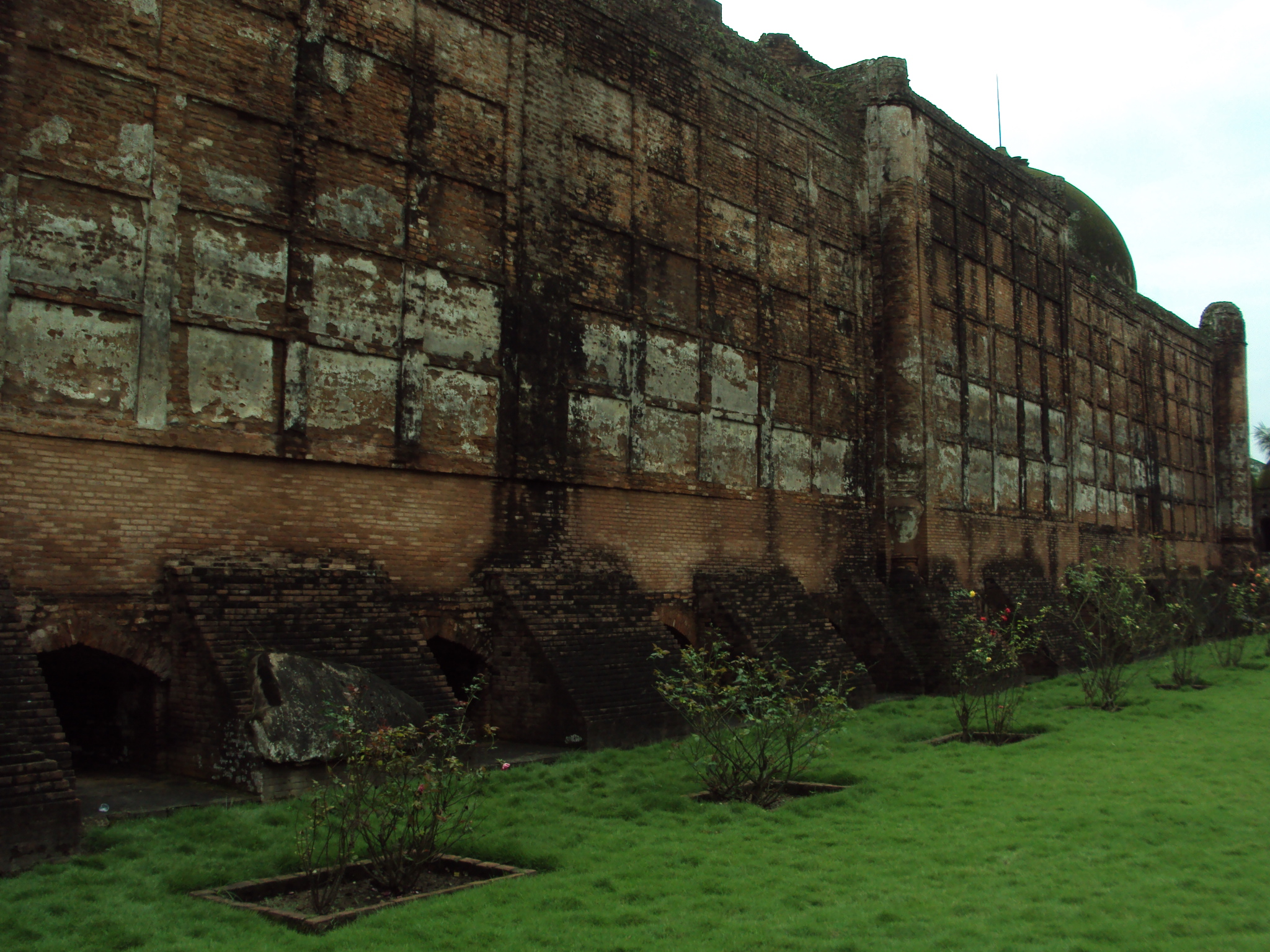
The arch supported Mosque

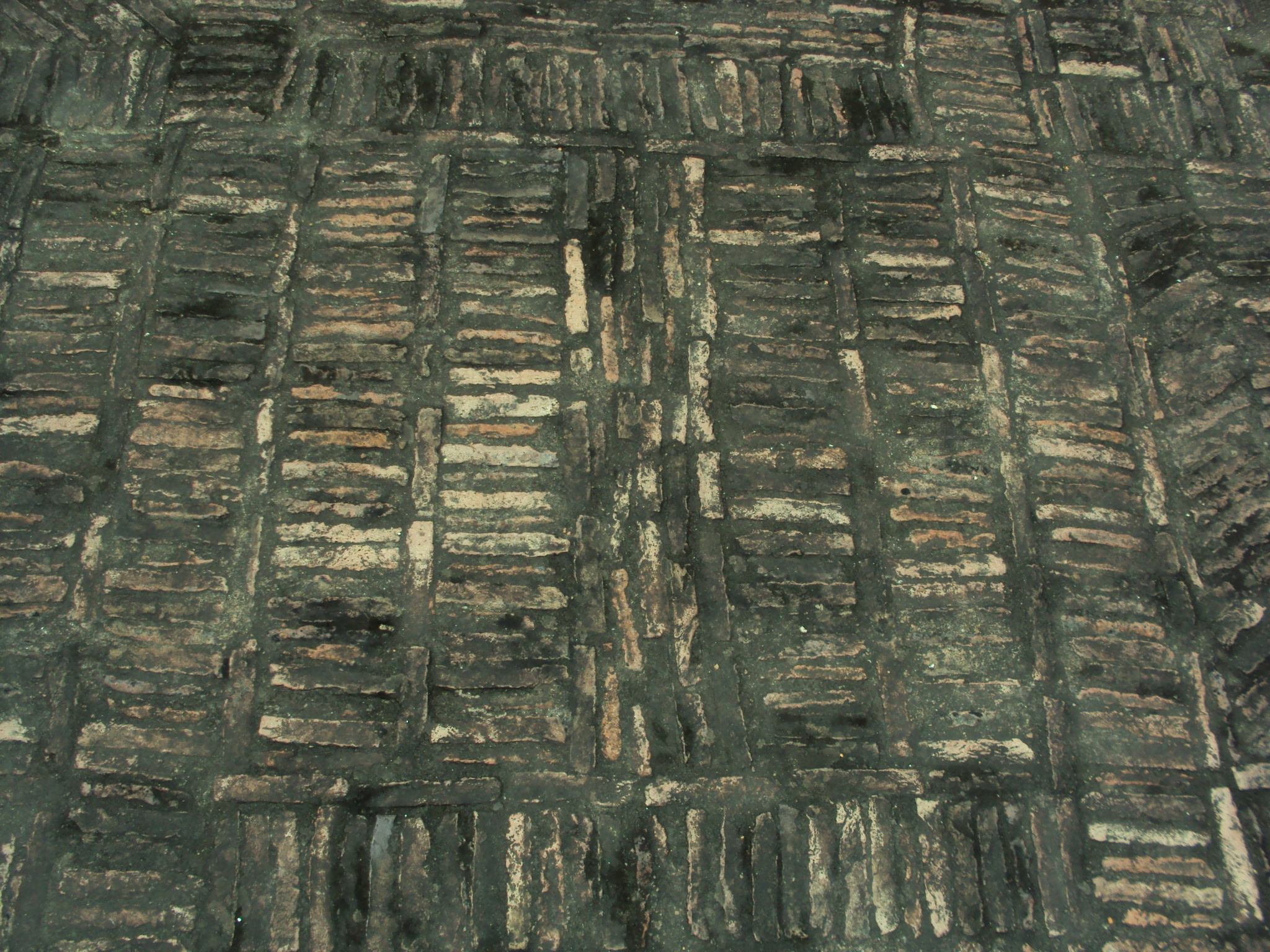
The square type mats depicted on the floor

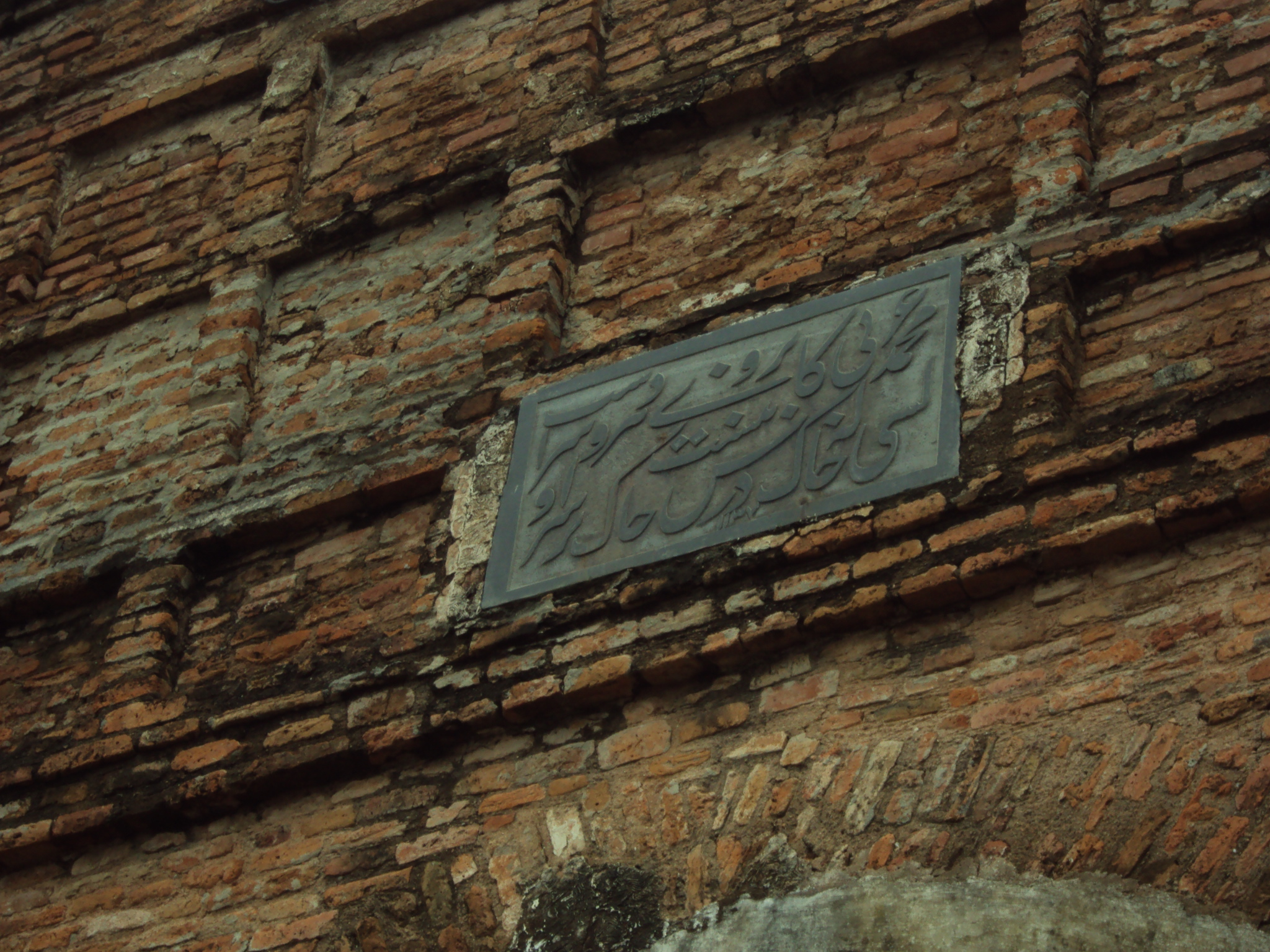
The Arabic inscription that reads: "Muhammad, the Arabian, is glory of both worlds. Dust be on the head of him who is not the dust of his portal"

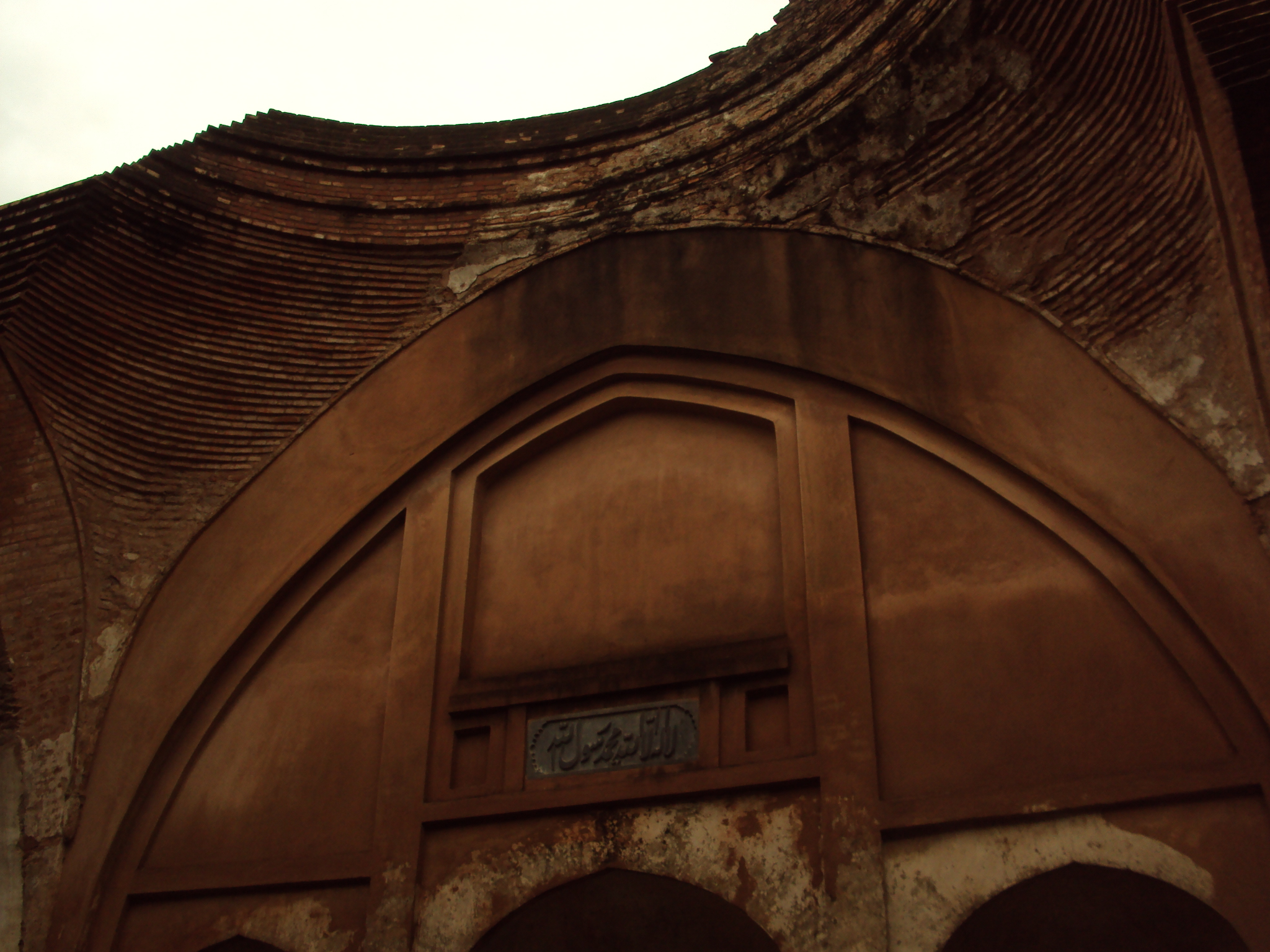
The Persian inscription states that the mosque was constructed by Nawab Nazim Murshid Quli Khan

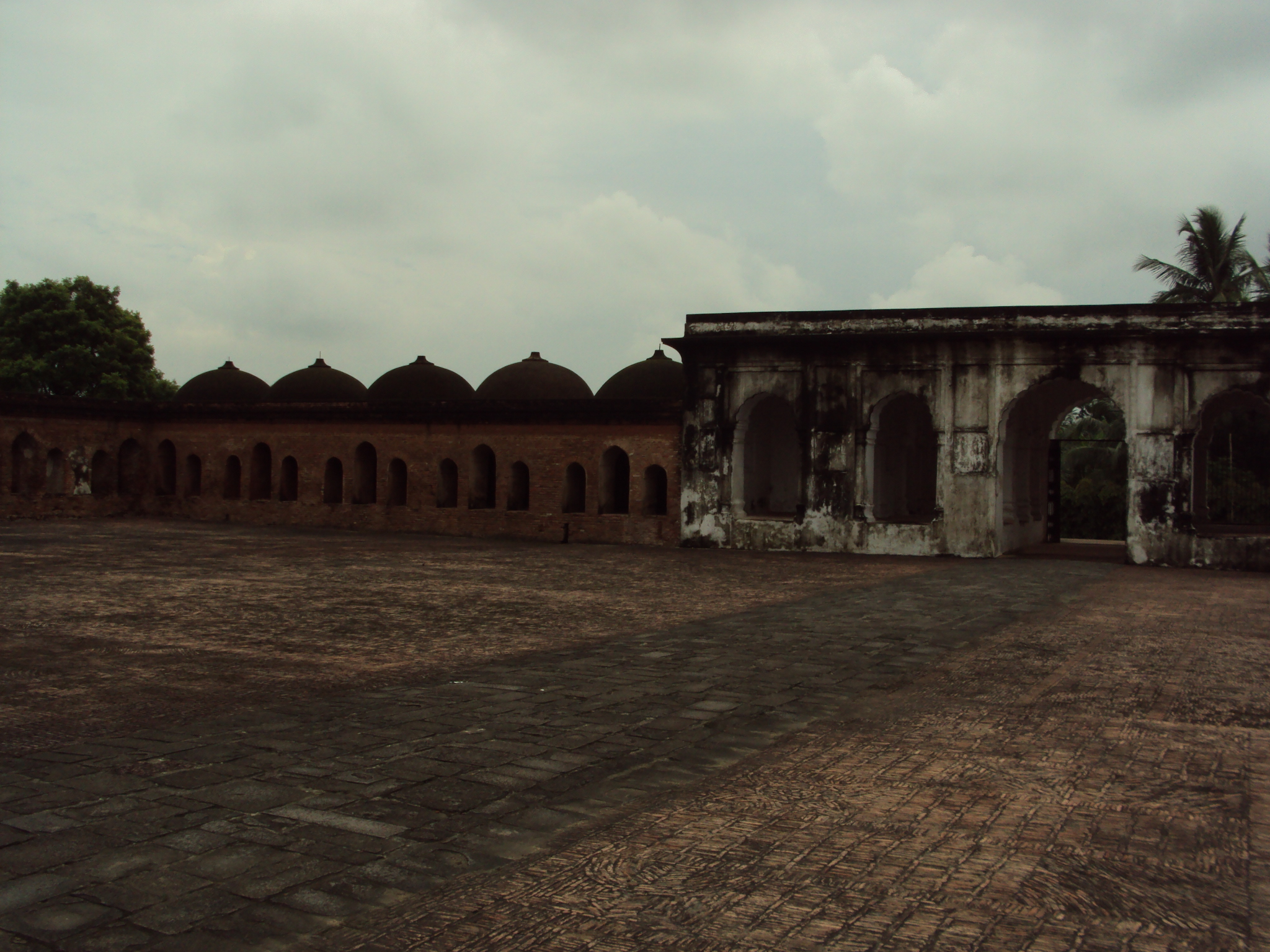
The open space or the terrace between the mosque and the entrance in the east

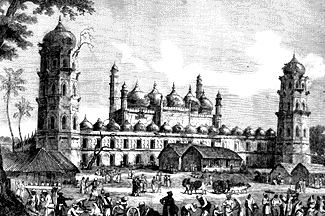
Early 19th-century view of the Katra Mosque

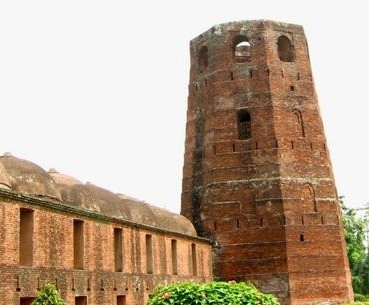
One of the towers, where the dome fell in, due to the 1897 earthquake

== See also ==
- Shia Islam in India
- List of mosques in India
- List of Monuments of National Importance in West Bengal
- Nawabs of Bengal and Murshidabad
