= Rosnaiganj =

Rosnaiganj Roshnibagh
- Village
- Location in West Bengal, India Rosnaiganj (India)
- Coordinates: 24.1849°N 88.2647°E
- Country: India
- State: West Bengal
- District: Murshidabad

Population (2011)
  - Total: 417

Languages
  - Official: Bengali, English
- Time zone: UTC+5:30 (IST)
- Telephone/STD code: 03482
- Vehicle registration: WB
- Lok Sabha constituency: Murshidabad
- Vidhan Sabha constituency: Murshidabad
- Website: murshidbad.nic.in

Rosnaiganj is a village in the Murshidabad-Jiaganj CD block in the Lalbag subdivision of Murshidabad district in the state of West Bengal, India.

== Geography ==
Cities, towns and locations in the Lalbag and Domkal subdivisions, Murshidabad district
M: municipal town, CT: census town, R: rural/ urban centre, H: historical place
Owing to space constraints in the small map, the actual locations in a larger map may vary slightly

=== Location ===
Rosnaiganj is located at 24.1849°N 88.2647°E.

The area was earlier popular as Dahpara and Farahbagh. However, as certain parts have been devoured by the Bhagirathi, parts of the existing area are known as Roshnibagh and Roshnaiganj. Roshnibagh is home to the Tomb of Sujauddin. There is a mosque known as Sujauddin's mosque. It was most likely built by Alivardi Khan after Shujauddin's death.

== Demographics ==
According to the 2011 Census of India, Rosnaiganj had a total population of 417, of which 213 (51%) were males and 204 (49%) were females. Population in the age range 0–6 years was 40. The total number of literate persons in Rosnaiganj was 296 (78.51% of the population 6 years).

== Roshnibagh Mausoleum ==
Shuja-ud-Din Muhammad Khan succeeded his father-in-law Murshid Quli Khan as the Nawab of Bengal in 1727 and ruled successfully till his death in 1739.

According to the List of Monuments of National Importance in West Bengal the Tomb of Sujauddin at Roshnibagh is a monument of national importance.

== Roshnibagh picture gallery ==
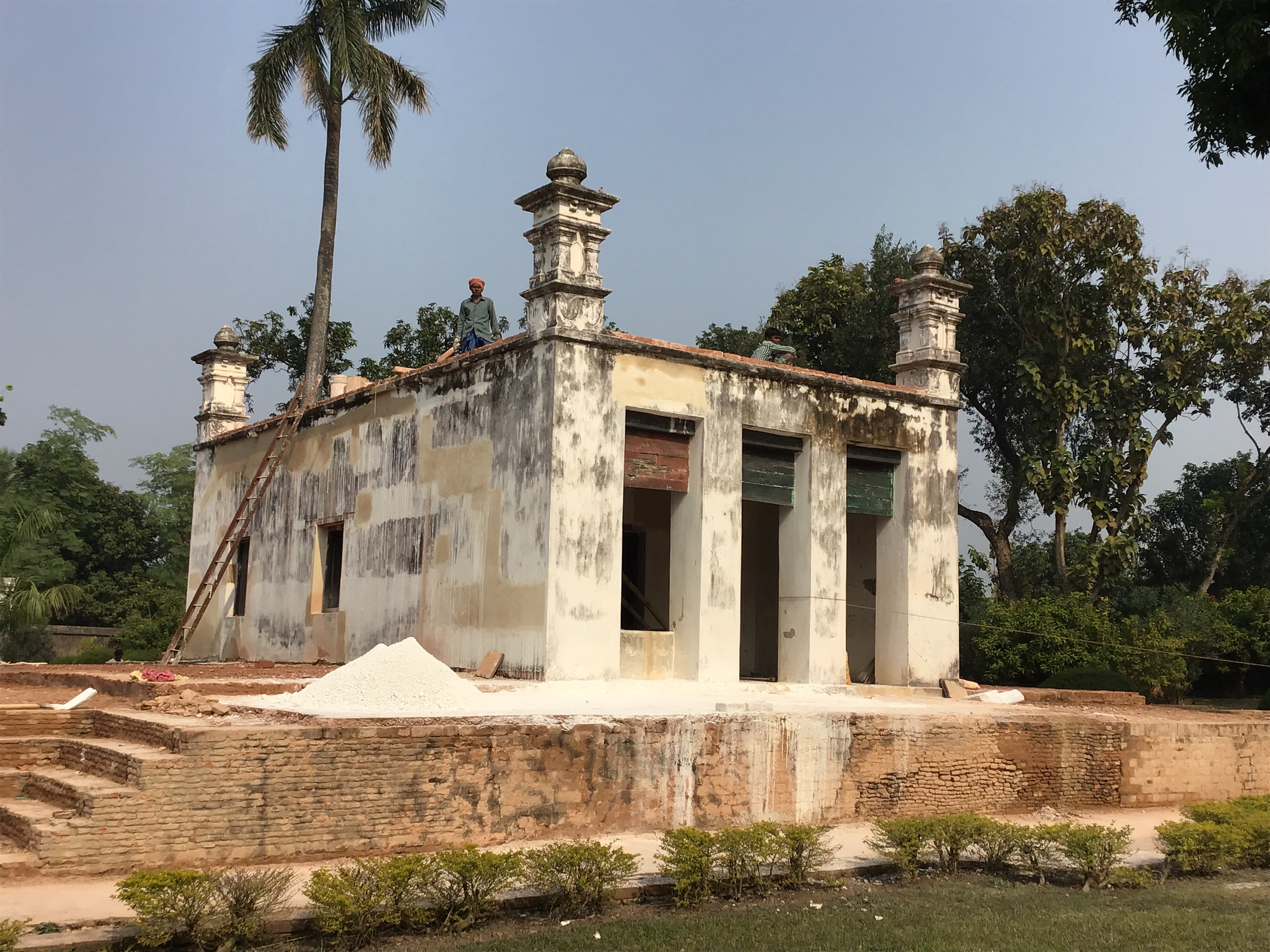
Tomb of Sujauddin

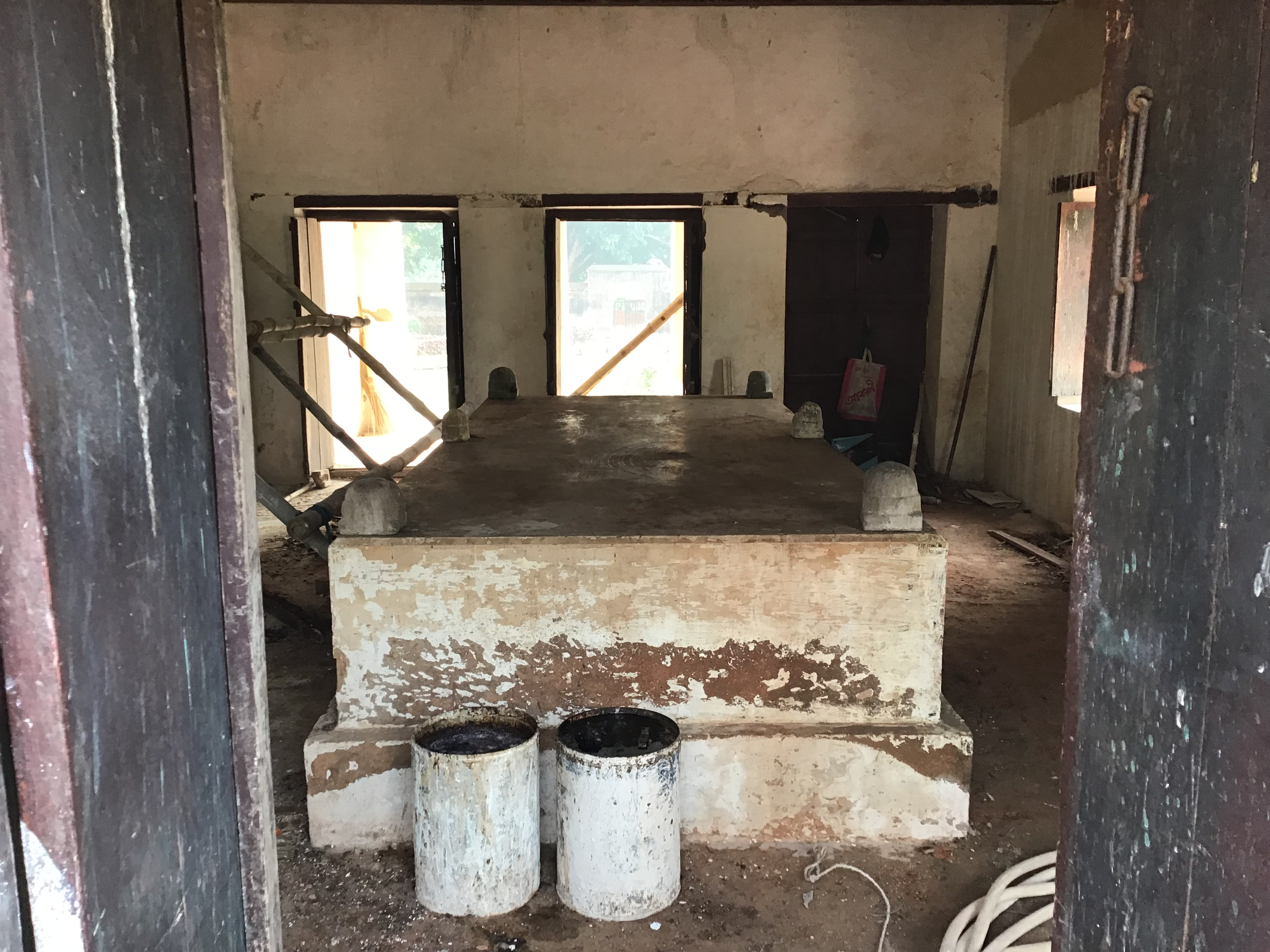
Tomb of Sujauddin

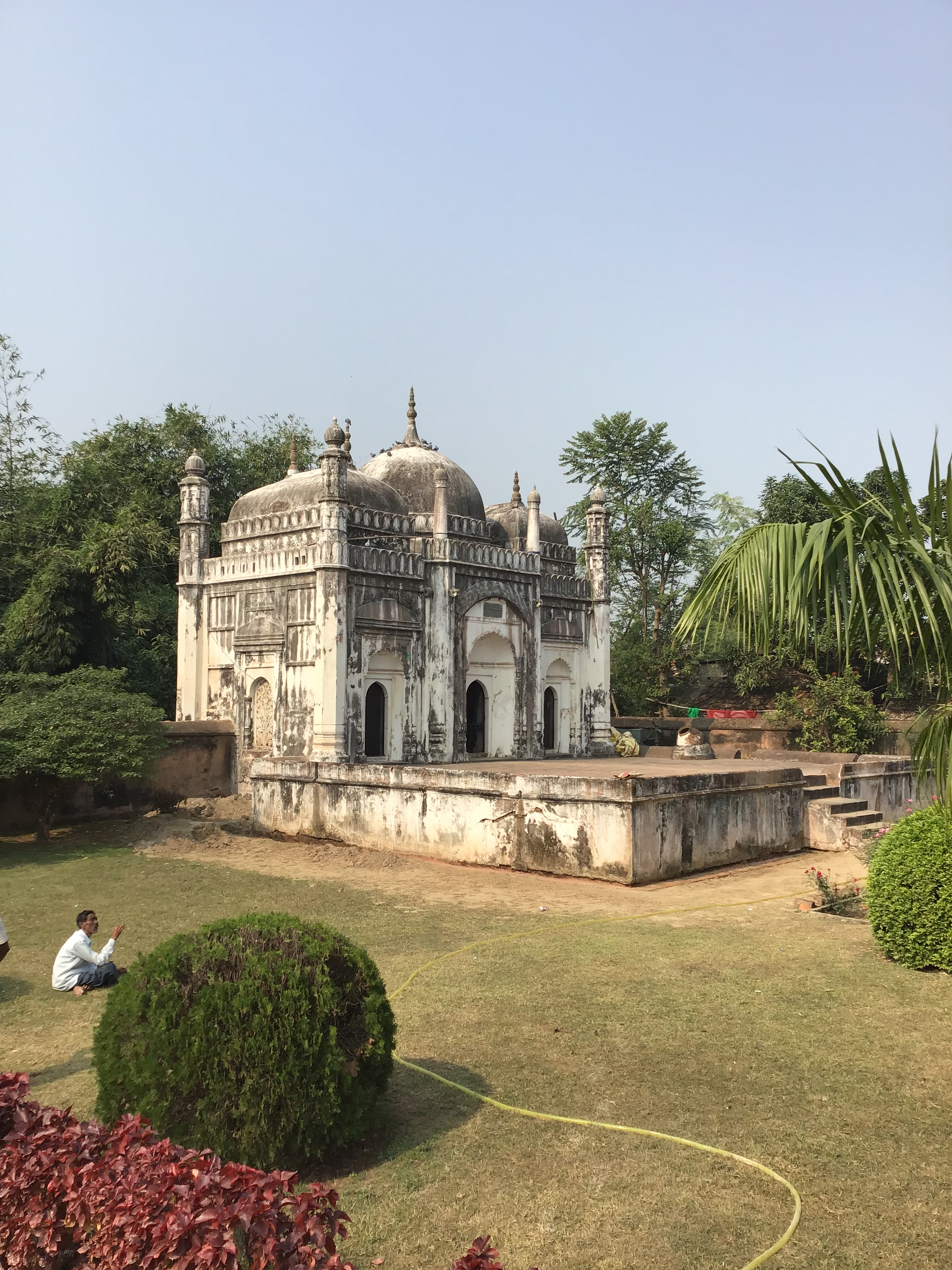
Sujauddin's Mosque at Roshnibagh

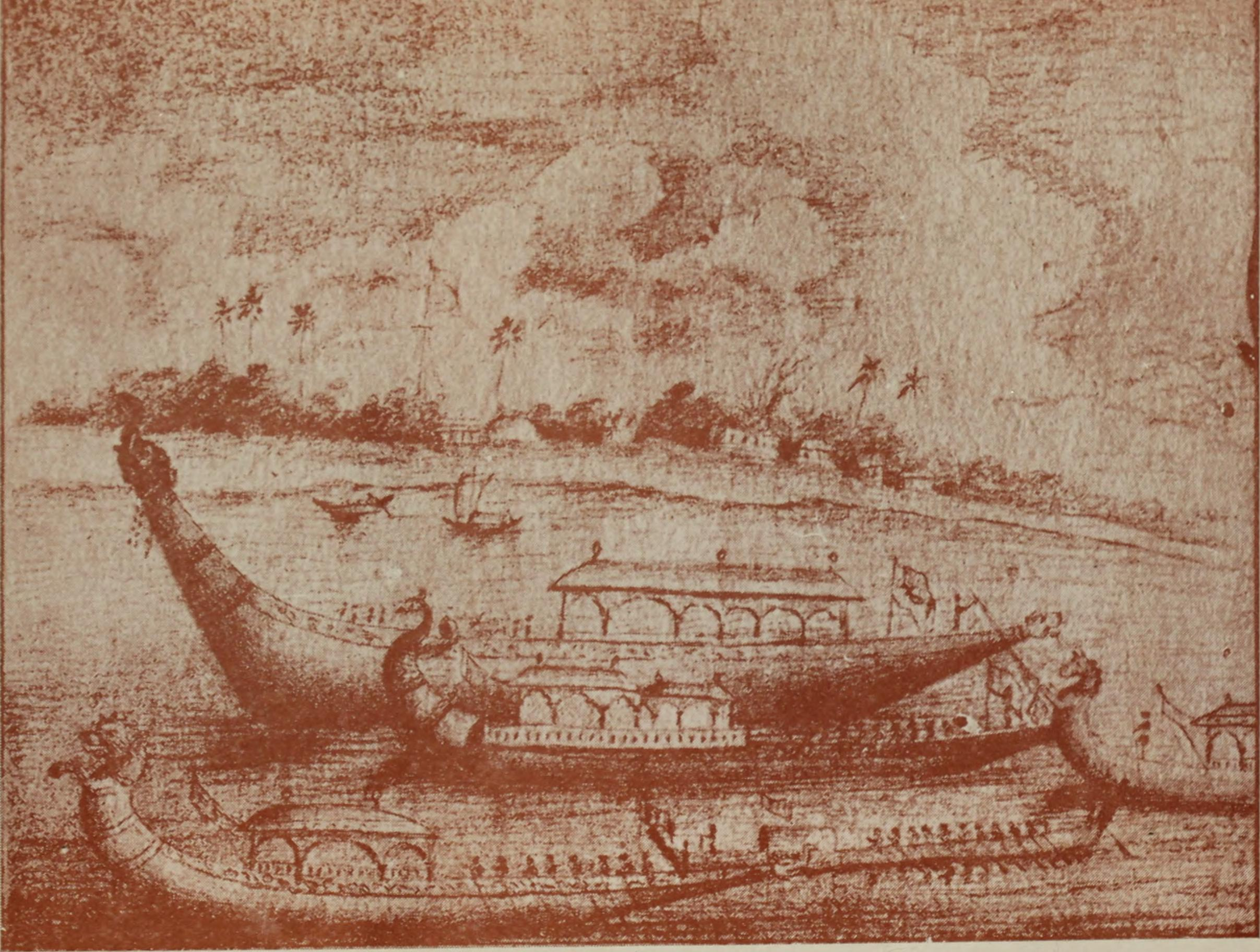
A painting from the book The Musnud of Murshidabad (1704-1904), published in 1905, showing the river line at Roshniganj. The text reads, “On the bank of the river at Roshniganj, stands a small building which accommodated the office of the boat establishment of the Nazims. It is known as the Neoara house. A large number of boats, of all descriptions, used to float in the river or rest at anchor near this house.”
