= Nabagram =

Nabagram may refer to:

- Nabagram, Murshidabad, a village in Murshidabad district, West Bengal, India
- Nabagram (community development block), a community development block in Murshidabad district, West Bengal, India
- Nabagram, Purulia, a town in Purulia district, West Bengal, India
- Nabagram, Hooghly, a town in Hooghly district, West Bengal, India
- Nabgram, a town in Pandabeswar CD Block in Bardhaman district in the state West Bengal, India
- Nabagram, Bardhaman, a village and railway station in Jamalpur CD Block in Bardhaman district, West Bengal, India
- Nabagram, Dakshin Dinajpur, a village in Dakshin Dinajpur district, West Bengal, India
- Nabagram (Vidhan Sabha constituency), in Murshidabad district
