= Siddheshwari Kali Mandir =

- সিদ্ধেশ্বরী কালীমন্দির
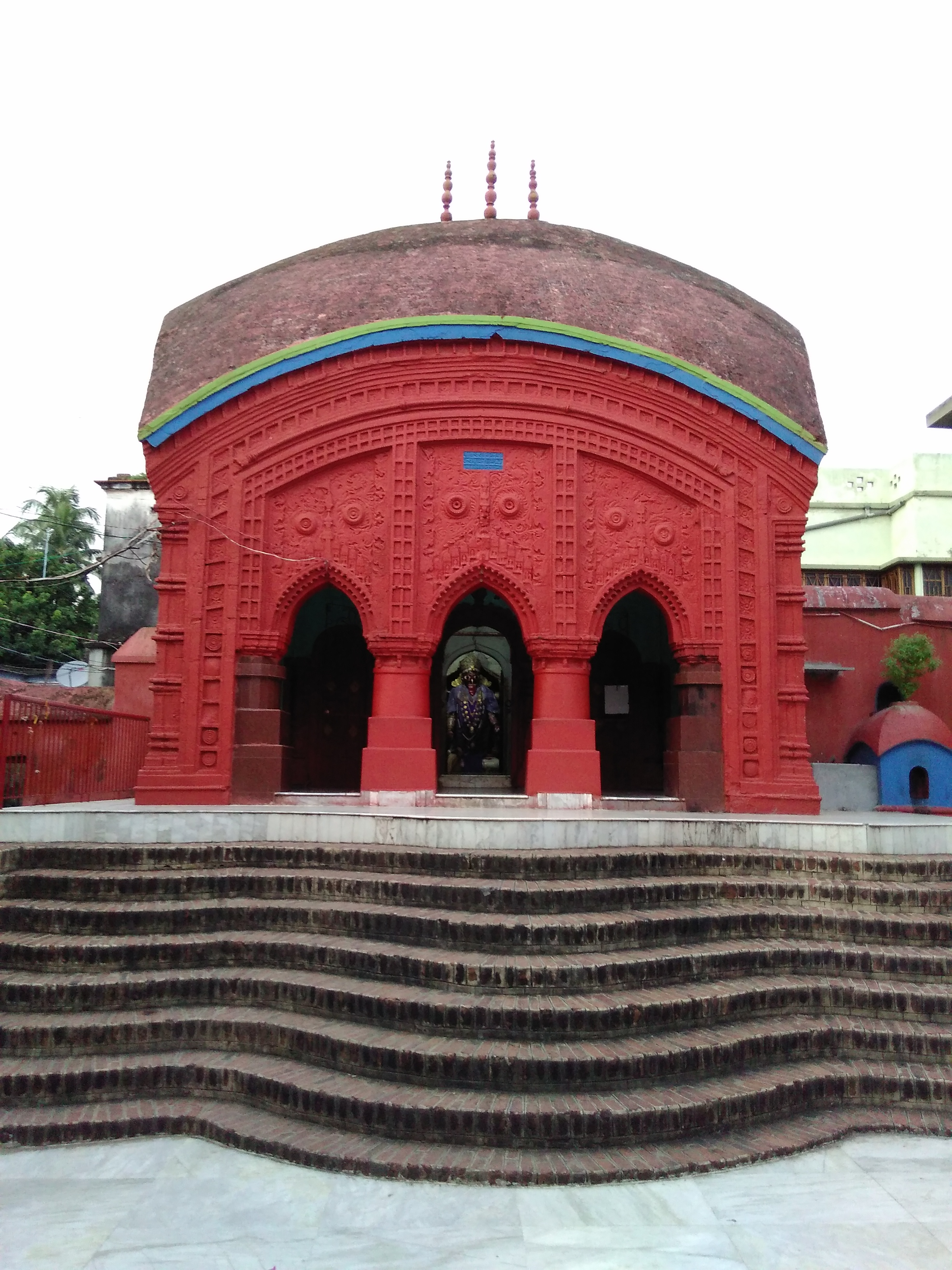
- Front view of Siddheshwari Kali Mandir

Religion
- Affiliation: Hinduism
- District: Purba Bardhaman
- Deity: Kali

Location
- Location: Kalna City
- State: West Bengal
- Country: India
- Geographic coordinates: 23°13′34.84″N 88°21′32.44″E

Architecture
- Type: Bengal temple architecture
- Style: Jor-bangla
- Founder: Raja Chitra Sen Roy (Rai)
- Date established: 1740; 285 years ago

Specifications
- Length: 19.6 feet (6.0 m)
- Height (max): 26.6 feet (8.1 m)

Siddheshwari Kali Mandir (Bengali: [Sid'dhēśbarī kālī mandira]) is a Śākta temple in Kalna City in Purba Bardhaman district of West Bengal. The Hindu goddess Kali or Kalika is worshiped in the form of Siddheshwari in this temple. Built by Chitrasen Roy, a zamindar of Burdwan, the temple stands near the banks of the Bhagirathi-Hooghly river in the northeastern part of the city. The temple is a great example of Jor-bangla architecture; established in the fifth decade of the 18th century.

There are five Shiva temples in the temple premises, which were built in the 18th century.

== Deities in the temple ==
Kali – emerged from Durga – in the form of Siddheshwari is the presiding deity of the temple.

=== Siddheshwari Kali ===
In the centre of Garbha griha, the Siddheshwari – a form of Kali – is seen in standing posture on base, with four arms. The murti of the deity made of neem (Indian lilac) wood is about five feet tall. At the feet of the deity lies Shiva, and in the left hand are Khadga and Normundu. This deity is considered the main source of power of the temple and adorned with various ornaments including crowns, golden necklaces.

=== Other Murtis ===
There are five Shiva temples (sub-temples) in the temple premises, which are Garbha griha with Lingams. Lingams are worshiped as Shiva.

== Gallery ==
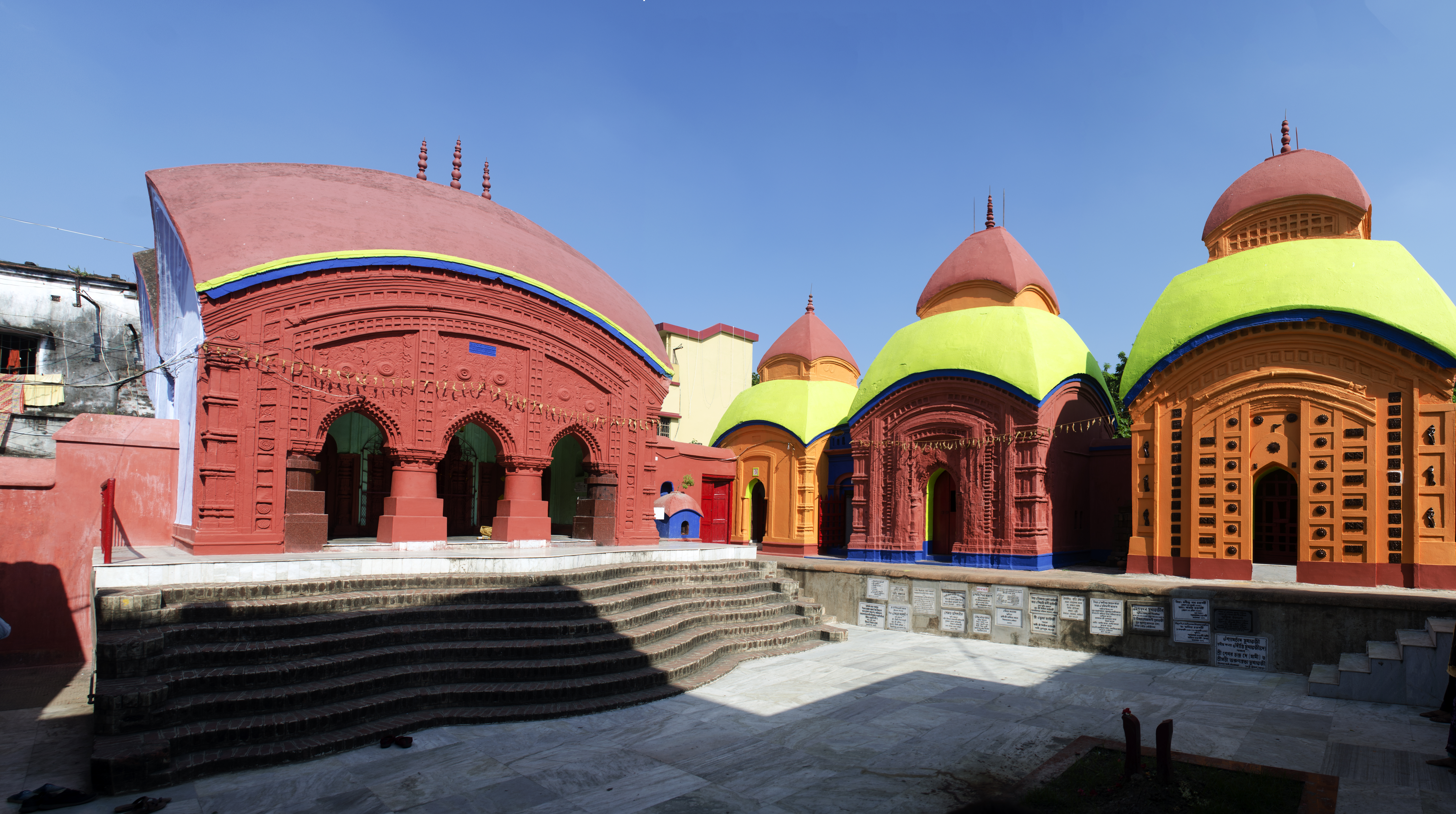
Siddheshwari Kalimandir with Āṭa-chala Shiva temples.

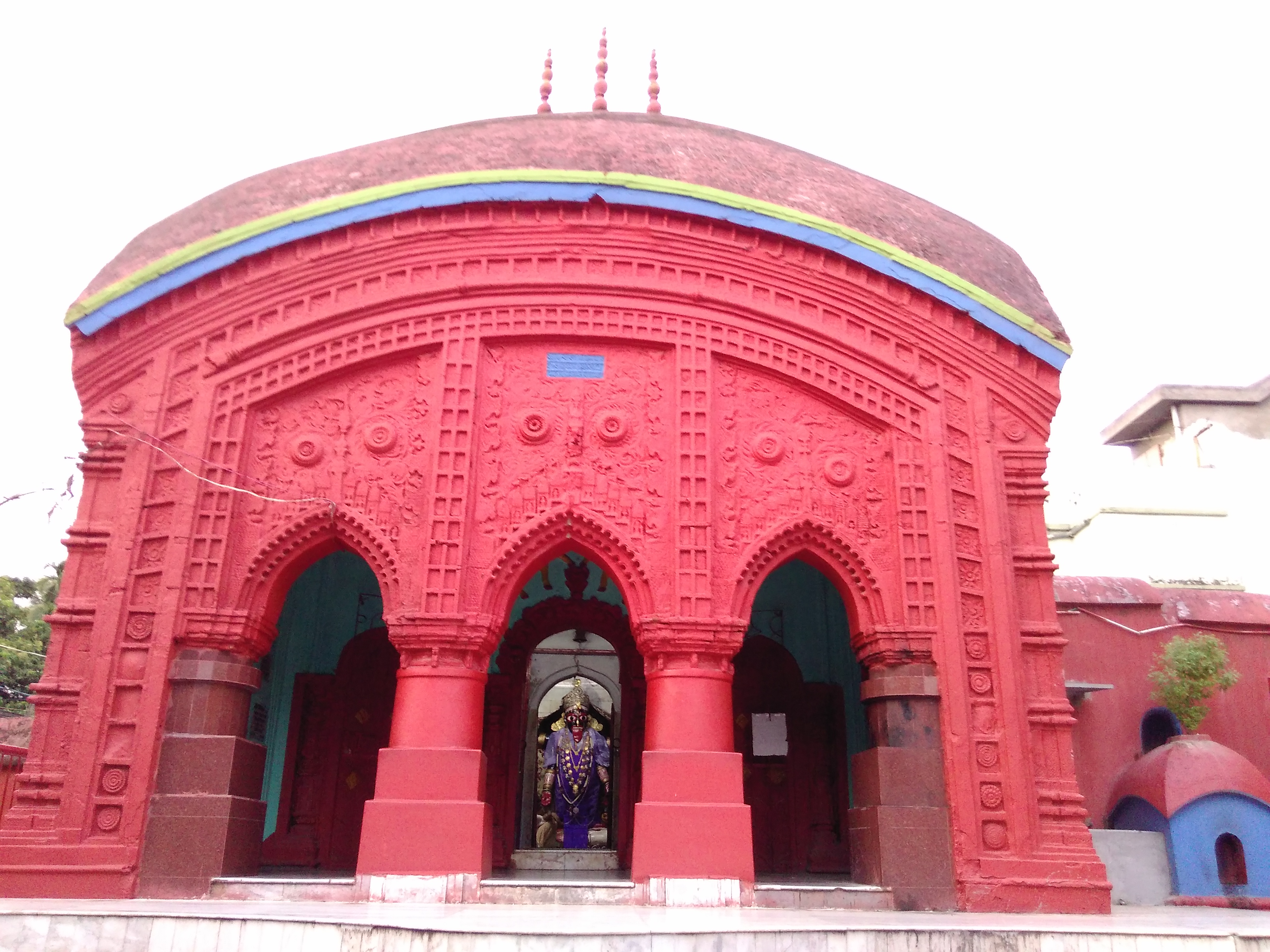
Temple facade.

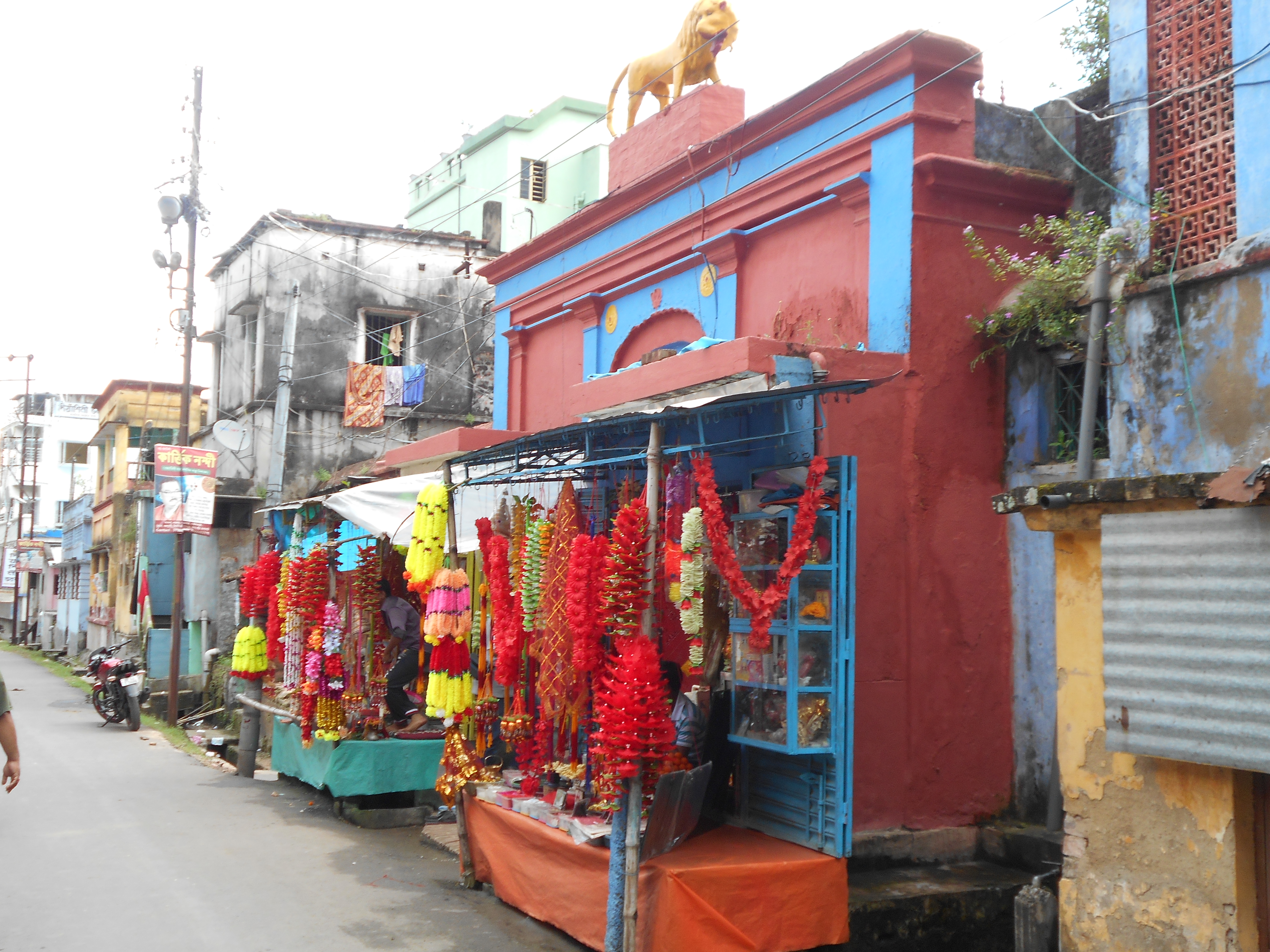
Main arcade of the temple.
