= Chala Style =

Style of a Hindu temple

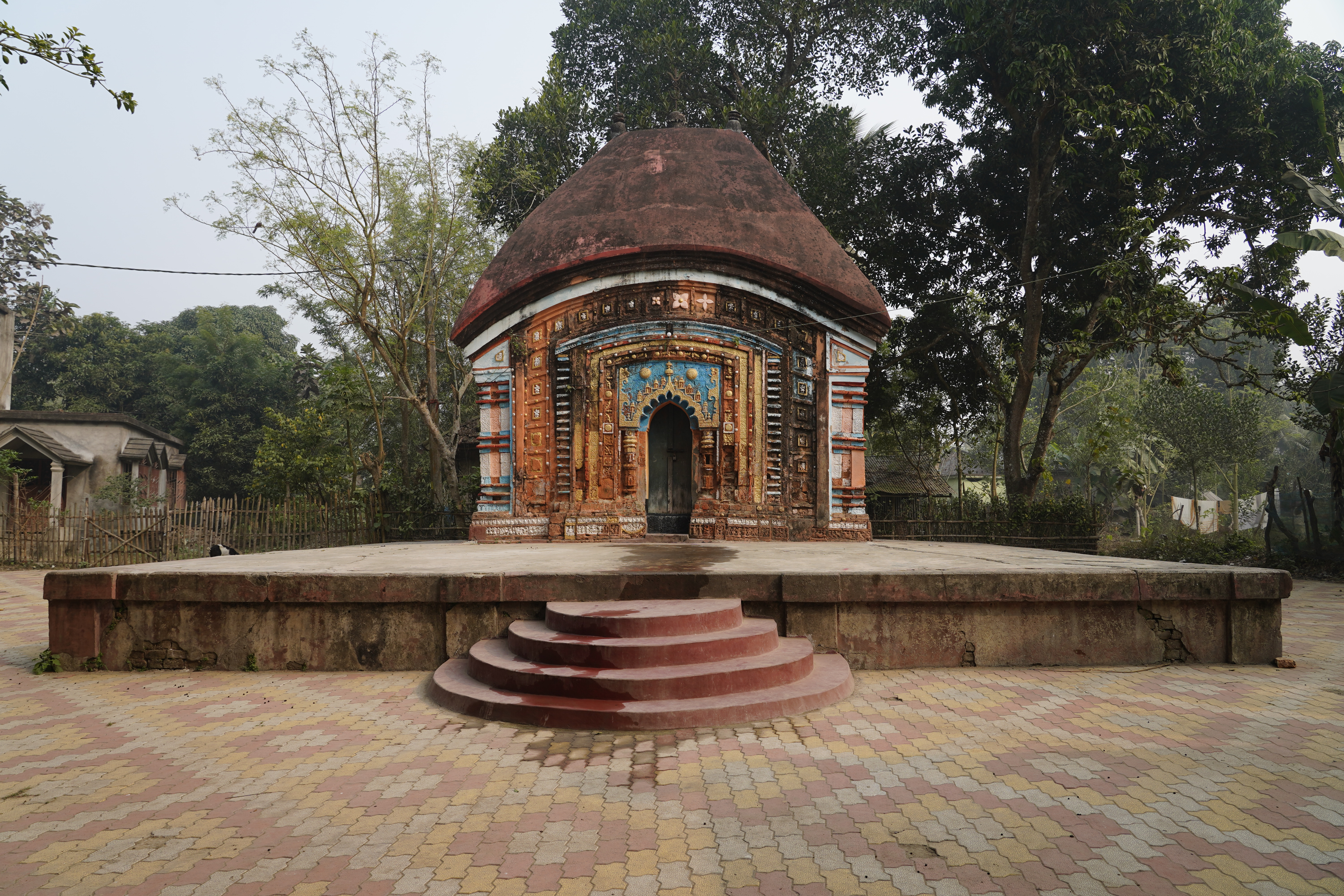
Char-chala Rudreshwar Charchala temple at Matiari in Nadia district, West Bengal

Chala Style (Bengali: চালা শিল্পরীতি) is a style of Bengal temple architecture, that originated in Bengal from the 15th centuries. Originating as a regional style in Hindu temple architecture. The main features of this style are curved tops and cornices. Chala-style temples in West Bengal were made of mud walls and thatched roofs. But, in East Bengal (now Bangladesh) it was built with bamboo structures and thatched roofs.

Chala-style temples were built all over Bengal. But most of the temples are found in the West Bengal. In the present day, the temples are now located in two separate national territories: the Indian state of West Bengal and Bangladesh.

== History ==
The presence of Chala-style is observed in the Mauryan period. Mauryan granaries are similar to Charchala, one of the types of Chala style. The stone temple at Garui in Paschim Bardhaman district of West Bengal, built in the 14th century, has a Chala-style or Bengal hut shaped roof. The oldest Chala-style temple is Singhabahini temple at Ghatal. However, the Kiriteswari temple is considered to be the oldest Chala style temple. The original Kiriteswari temple was destroyed in 1405.

== Types ==
There are different types of temples in Chala-style. These types are specified by number of Chala. Mainly 4 types of Chala-style temples are observed. The four most common temple types under Chala-style are Do-chala, Char-chala, At-chala and Baro-Chala.

=== Do-chala ===
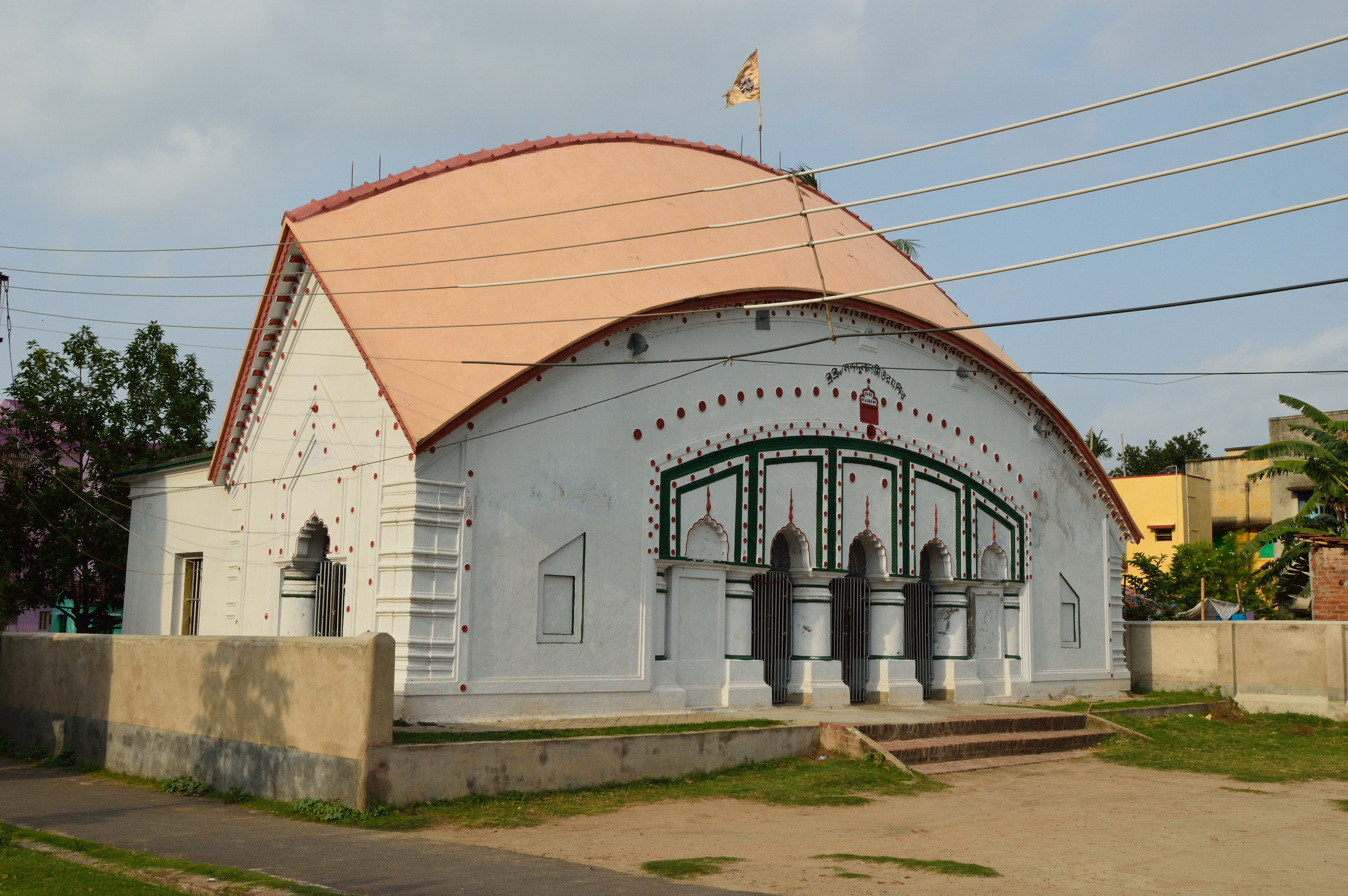
The Nandadulal Jiu Mandir, Chandannagar, West Bengal, India.

The word "Do" used in Bengali language means two. Temples built in this Chala style have two Chalas (roof) and gable eands. Temples of this style consist of two sloping roofs in front and back. The floor of the temples is rectangular. Most of the temples built in the Do-chala style have three arches on their fronts. Do-chala temples have one or three entrances. In temples with a single entrance, the entrance is built at the front. Narayana Temple at Bhanga in Faridpur is a single entrance temple. Some do-chala temples are built with three entrances, entrances are made on the front, left and right sides of the temples. The Panchamukhi Shiva temple built in Do-chala style at Baranagar in Murshidabad district has three entrances.

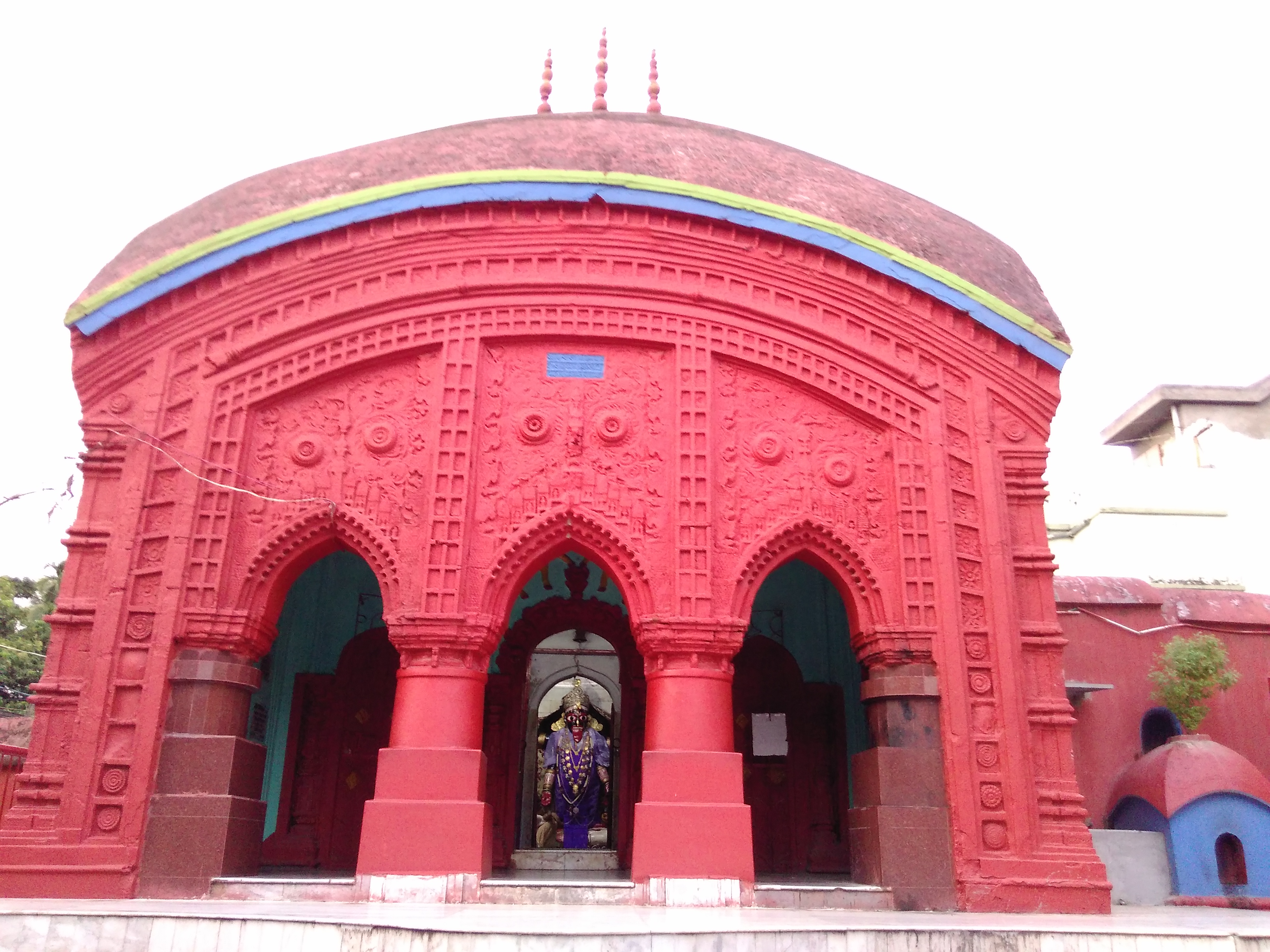
Jor-bangla Siddheshwari Kali Temple at Kalna City in West Bengal.

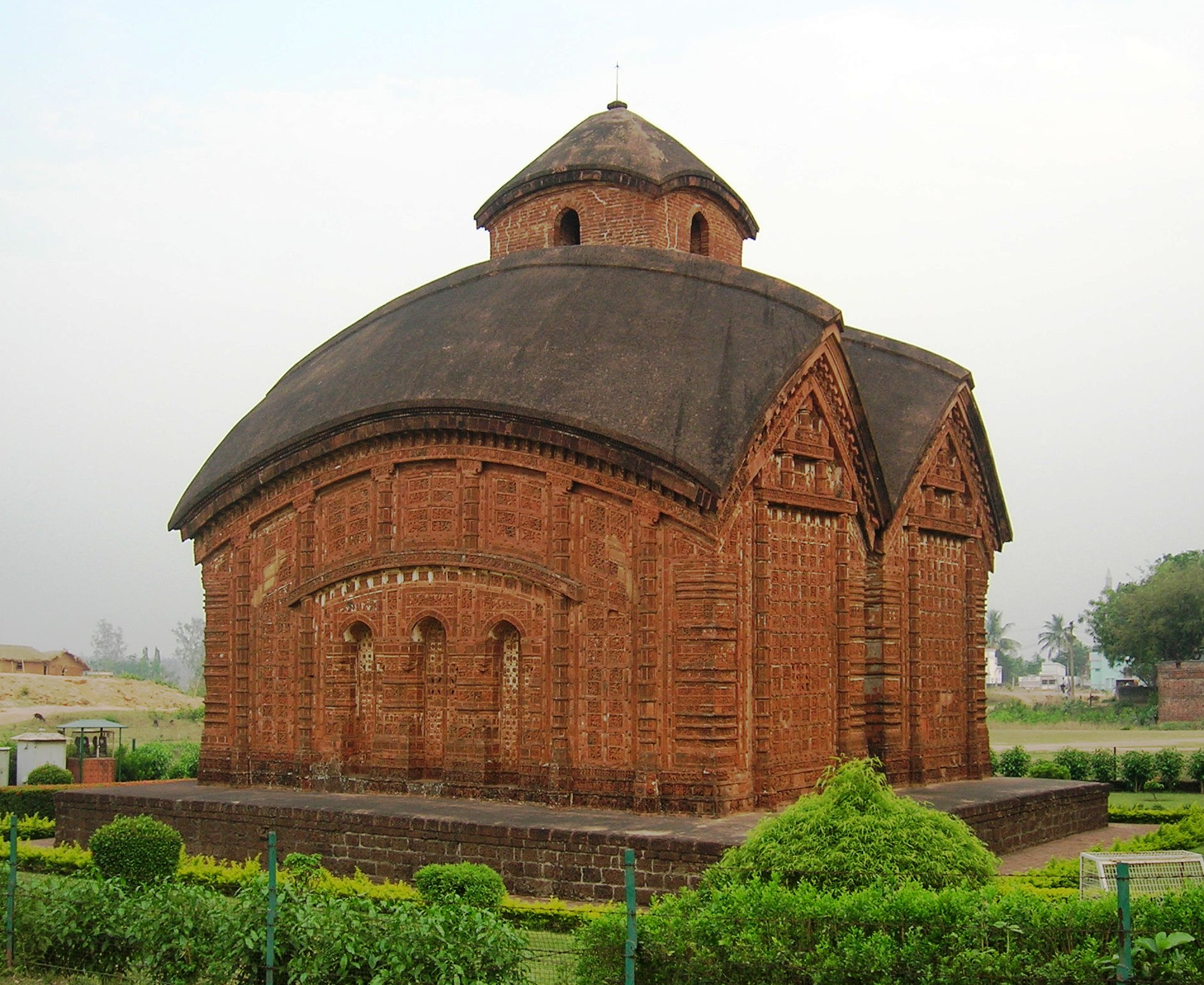
Jor-Bangla Temple (c. 1655), Bishnupur, West Bengal, India.

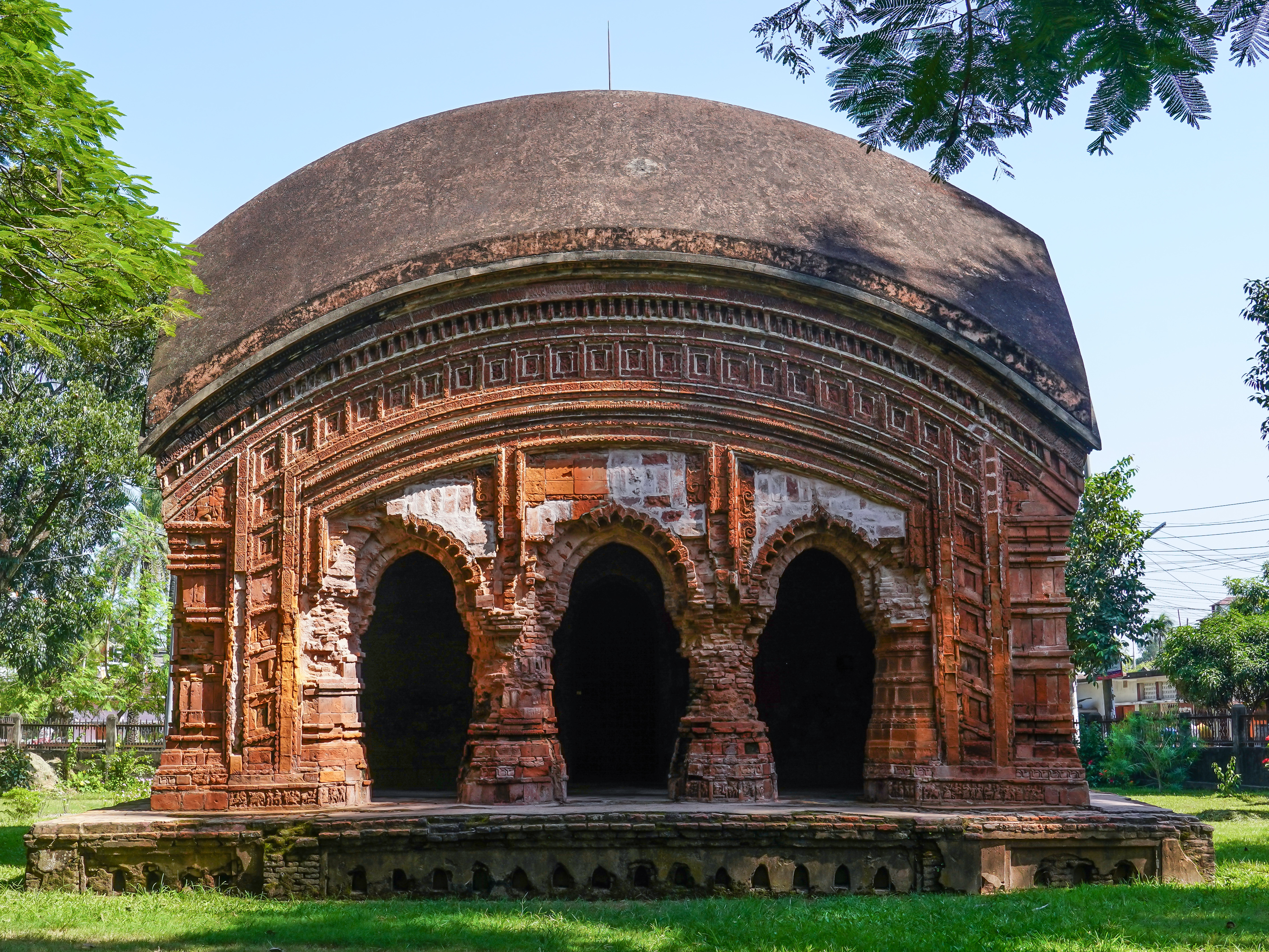
Jor Bangla Temple, Pabna, Bangladesh.

To further strengthen the structure of the temple, two Do-chala temples are paired side by side, popularly known as Jor-bangla style. Apart from the tower; a few prominent Jor-bangla style temples are the Siddheswari Kali Temple at Kalna City, the Gopinath Temple at Pabna and the Radha-Krishna Temple at Birnagar. In many cases, a char-chala roof is constructed between the two do-chalas of the Jor-Bengali style temples. Jor Bangla Temple (also called Keshta Rai temple) at Bishnupur was built in this style. According to David McCutchion, Jor Bangla style temples are mostly observed in the area from Purulia to Faridpur (i.e. south of the Ganges and west of the Padma).

=== Char-chala ===
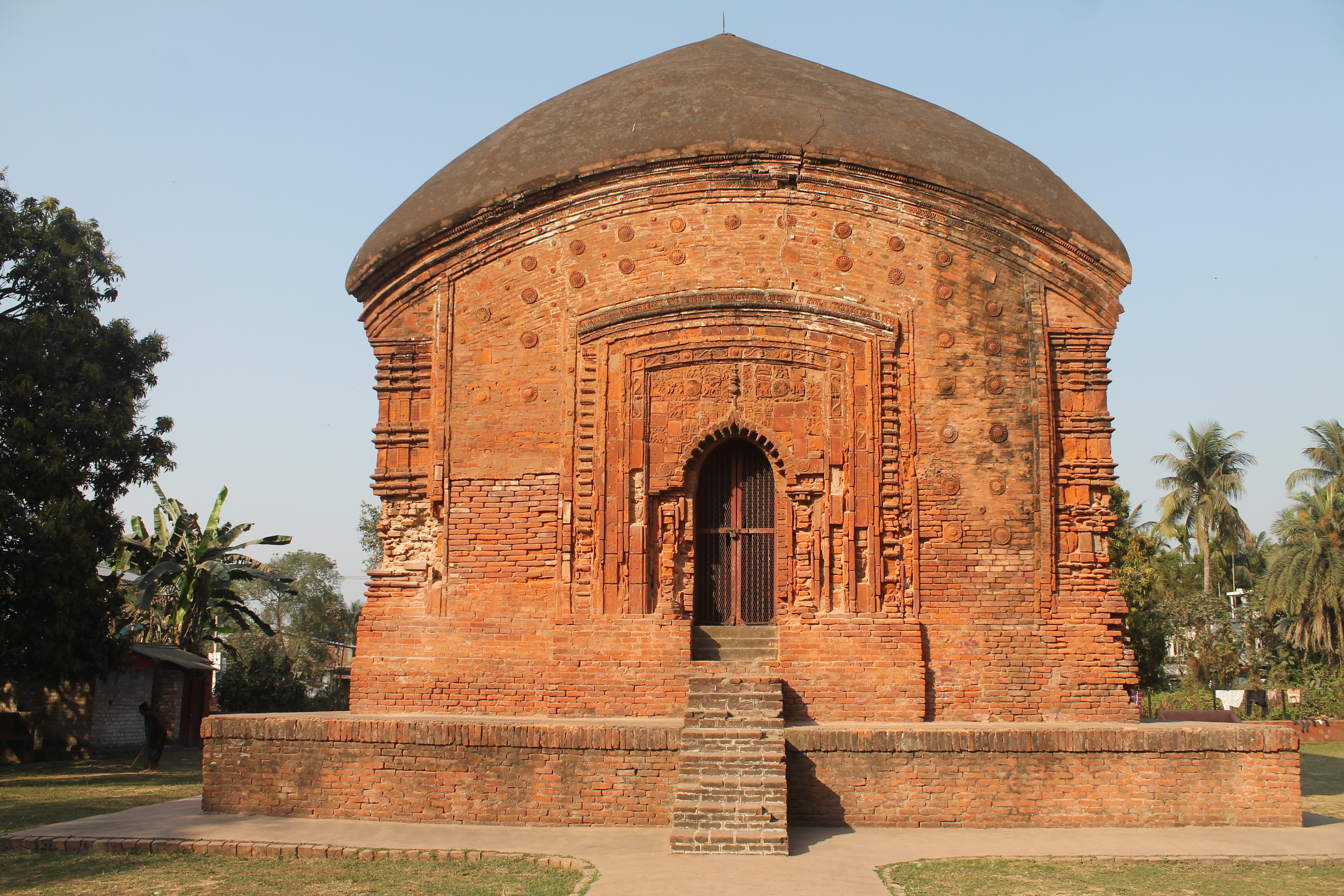
Charchala temple at Palpara in Nadia district.

In Char-chala style, the temple's roof consists of four "Chalas" (sloping roof). Sloping chalas meet at the mid-point of the roof. Generally Char-chala temple is built on a square base; but, some temples are built on elongated base. Most of the temples built in the Char-chala style have one arche on their front. The terracotta temple at Palpara and Raghabeswar temple at Diknagar are Char-chala style temple with a single entrance and elongated base.

=== At-chala ===
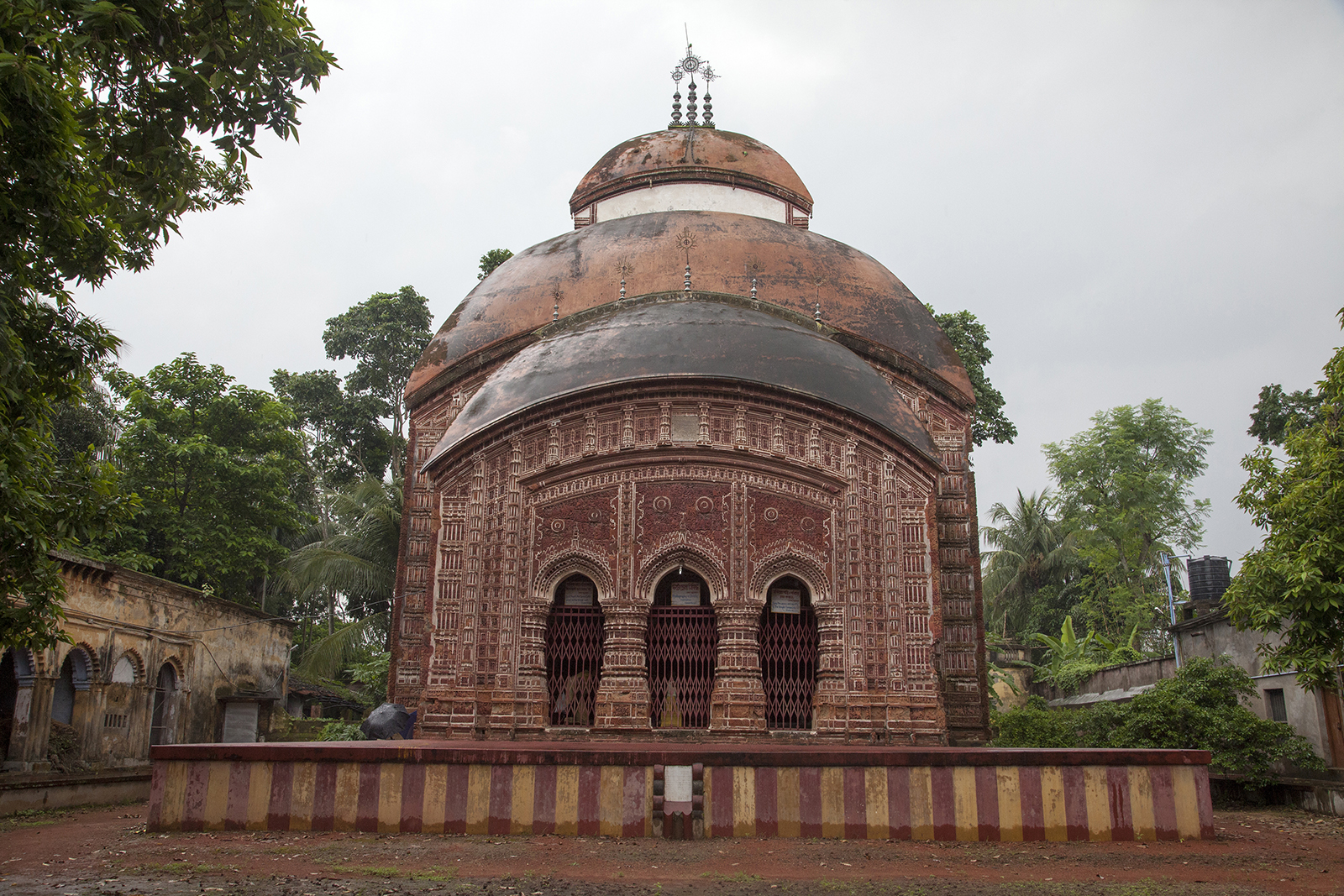
At-chala Radhagobind Temple, Antpur, West Bengal.

In At-chala style, the temple's roof consists of eight "Chalas" (sloping roof). These 8 chalas form 2 Char-chala, one of which large and the other is small. The large char-chala is placed leaning on the 4 walls of the main chamber of the temple. After the large chalas reach the required height above the center of the temple chamber, they form the pedestal for supporting walls of the smaller Char-chala. In many cases, temples of this style have a Char-chala structure attached to the central chamber to provide structural strength and create a corridor. Kolkata's famous Kalighat Kali Temple is built in At-chala style. Among the very large At-chala temples are Bindavanchandra Temple at Guptipara and Radhagobind Temple at Antpur, both temples are located in Hooghly district. The Shiva temple built in 1725 at Sahaganj in Hooghly district and the Nandakisora temple built in 1741 at Halisahar in North 24 Parganas district are small-scale At-chala style temples.

== Influence ==
During the Mughal period the do-chala roof was to be adopted by the Muslims and even exported to other parts of India, where it became a prominent feature of seventeenth-century architecture in Delhi, Lahore, Gulberg, etc. In the eighteenth century, from Delhi, Lahore or Gulberg it moved to the palace balconies and garden pavilions of Rajasthan.

The Naulakha Pavilion, located next to the Sheesh Mahal courtyard in the northern part of the Lahore Fort, is built in the do-chala style, white marble used in its construction.

== See also ==
- Bengal temple architecture
- Hindu temple architecture
