= Gopinath Temple, Pabna =

Gopinath Temple
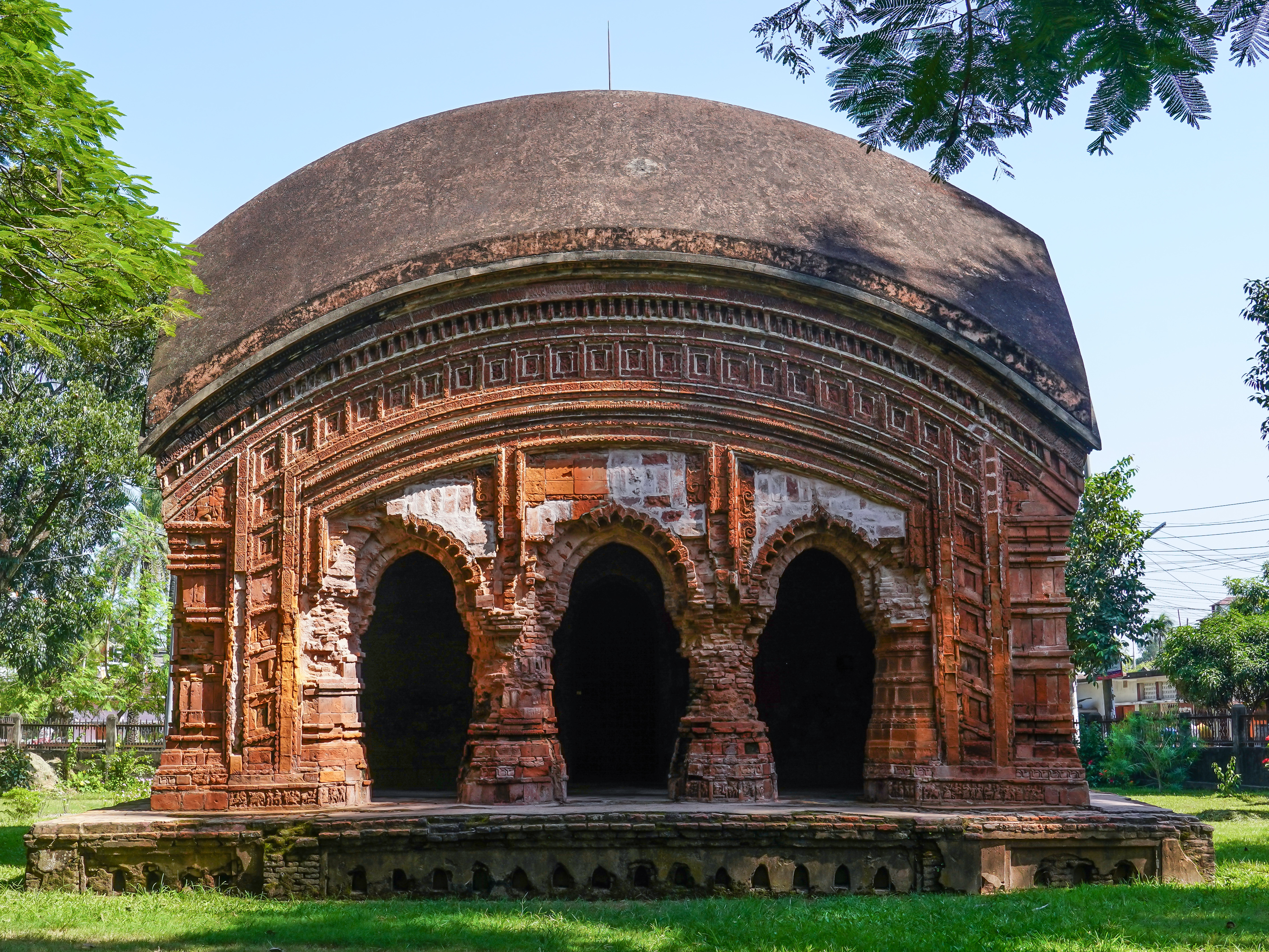

Religion
- Affiliation: Hinduism
- District: Pabna
- Deity: Gopinath

Location
- Location: Jor-Bangla Para
- Municipality: Pabna
- Country: Bangladesh
- Interactive map of Gopinath Temple
- Coordinates: 24°0.090′N 89°14.701′E

Architecture
- Type: Bengal temple architecture
- Style: Jor-Bangla (Chala Style)
- Founder: Brajmohan Krori
- Funded by: Brajmohan Krori
- Completed: 1856-1857

Specifications
- Length: 7.92 metres (26.0 ft)
- Width: 7.81 metres (25.6 ft)
- Height (max): 7.01 metres (23.0 ft)

Gopinath Temple, also known as Jor-Bangla Temple, is a Krishna temple at Pabna city of Rajshahi Division. In the past, the Hindu god Krishna was worshiped as Gopinath in this temple, but currently no worship is done. It is believed that the temple was built by Brajmohan Krori who was the tahsildar of Murshidabad Nawab. The temple is a great example of Jor-Bangla temple architecture belongs to Chala style, which was built in the 6th decade of the 19th century.

The terracotta plaques on the front arches of the temple depict the battle between the army of Rama and Ravana, which are now damaged or destroyed. At that time, the facade decorations served as visual illustrations of the popular religious texts Ramayana and Mahabharata.

The temple is preserved as one of the archaeological monuments of Bangladesh by the Department of Archaeology.

== Location ==
The Gopinath temple is located at KalaChand Para in the south-eastern part of Pabna city. Its geographical coordinates are 24°0.090' North and 89°14.701' East. This temple stands on a slightly curved plinth with niches at the bottom in the middle of an open space surrounded by houses.

== History ==
=== Background ===
From the 16th century onwards, Bengal witnessed a revival of temple building activity. Also, the emergence of Gaudiya Vaishnavism as a result of Chaitanya's propagation of the concept of Bhakti devotion to lord (Krishna) combined with a stream of vernacular literature in the form of prose and poetry created a favorable environment for temple construction. Among the many temple styles that developed during this period, the most popular was the Chala style temple, which is a replica of the domestic hut. Jore-Bangla temples including the Gopinath temple at Pabna belong to this Chala style.

Mrinmoyee Ray, a researcher at the New Delhi-based National Museum Institute of the History of Art, Conservation and Museology, points out two different reasons or contexts for the construction of the temple in the West Bengal-based magazine The Chitrolekha International Magazine on Art and Design. They are – Firstly, the construction of the temple can be perceived and interpreted as a struggle for power and identity in contemporary society. Temple building activity was a symbol and evidence of protected wealth. The temple thus became the embodiment of new power, and sought authority and social recognition. Secondly, by presenting himself as a pious and religious person (a devotee of Radhakrishna), he sought a familiar way of legitimizing his wealth and finding recognition and identity in the contemporary social order.

=== Before 1910: Construction and worship ===
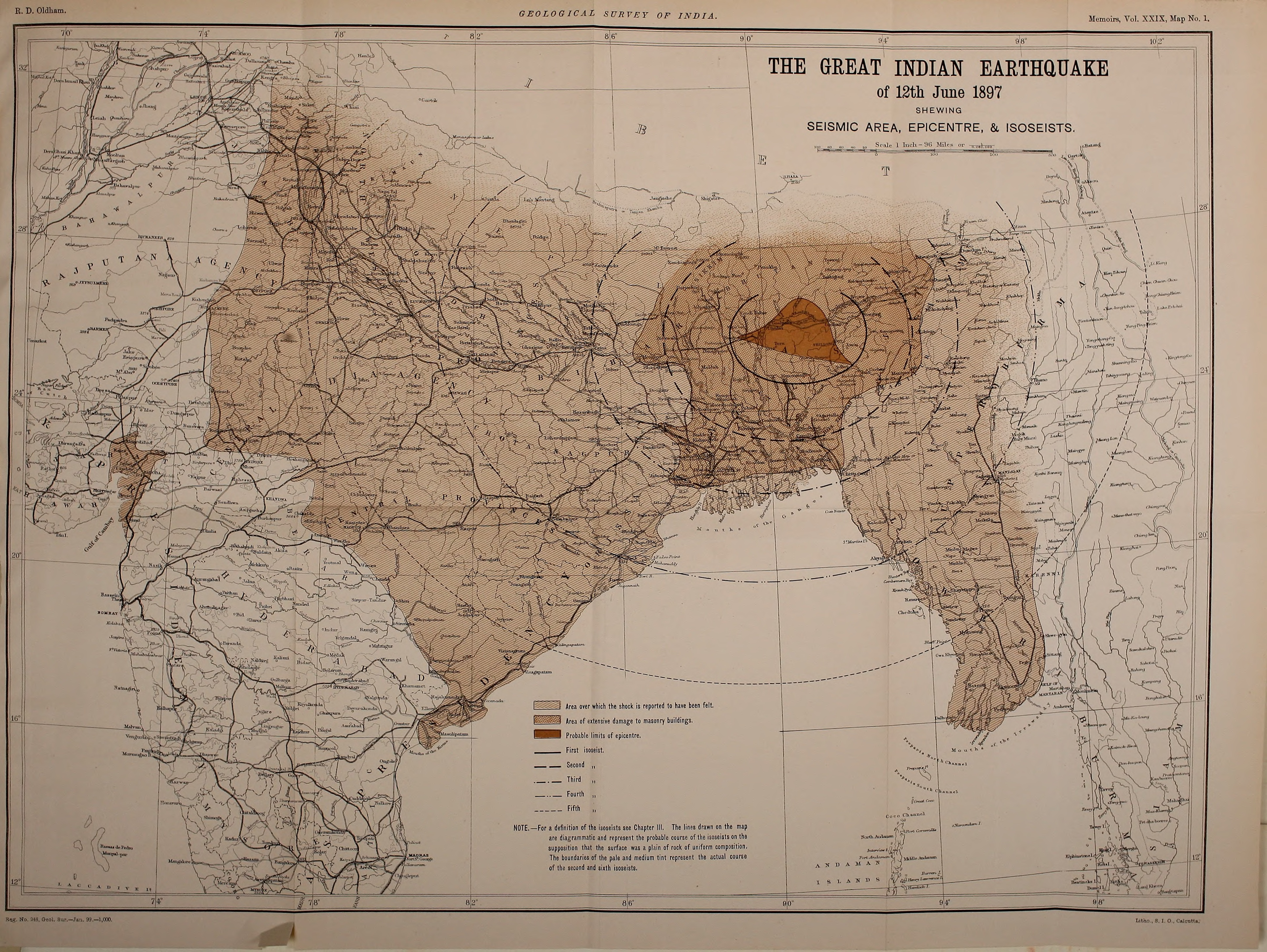
The map mentions Pabna among the areas affected by the 1897 earthquake.

Due to the absence of any authentic record, there are various differences and inconsistency in determining the period of establishment and construction of the temple through other sources. Under these circumstances, it is not possible to place this temple within a definite chronological framework. Indologist David McCutchion tentatively dated it to the 17th century. According to local folklore, the Jor Bangla temple (Gopinath Temple) was built in the mid-nineteenth century (1801–1900). From the information and description provided by Radharman Saha, it appears that the patron of the temple (Brajmohan Krori) earned his wealth quickly, but not by inheritance basis like the zamindars during Nawabi regime. The Tehsildar of the Nawabs of Murshidabad, Brajmohan Krori built the temple. However, as no inscriptions have been found from the temple, its exact history is not known.

In 1897, an earthquake of moment magnitude 8.2–8.3 occurred in the state of Assam, known as the 1897 Assam earthquake. Several parts of the temple were damaged in this earthquake.

According to the Pabana Jelara Itihasa (Pistory of Pabna District) written by Radharaman Saha, the temple had an murti of Gopinath and was regularly worshipped. The temple was used as a place of worship till the end of the first decade of the 20th century, and worship was held. In 1910, the murti of Gopinath was moved to the local Kali temple and has remained there ever since.

=== 1910–present ===
After the partition of India, the temple fell into disrepute and neglect for a long time, due to which the pillars, walls and decorations of the temple were damaged. Later, during the Pakistani rule in the 1960s, the temple was renovated with the efforts of the Pabna District Commissioner.

== Architecture ==
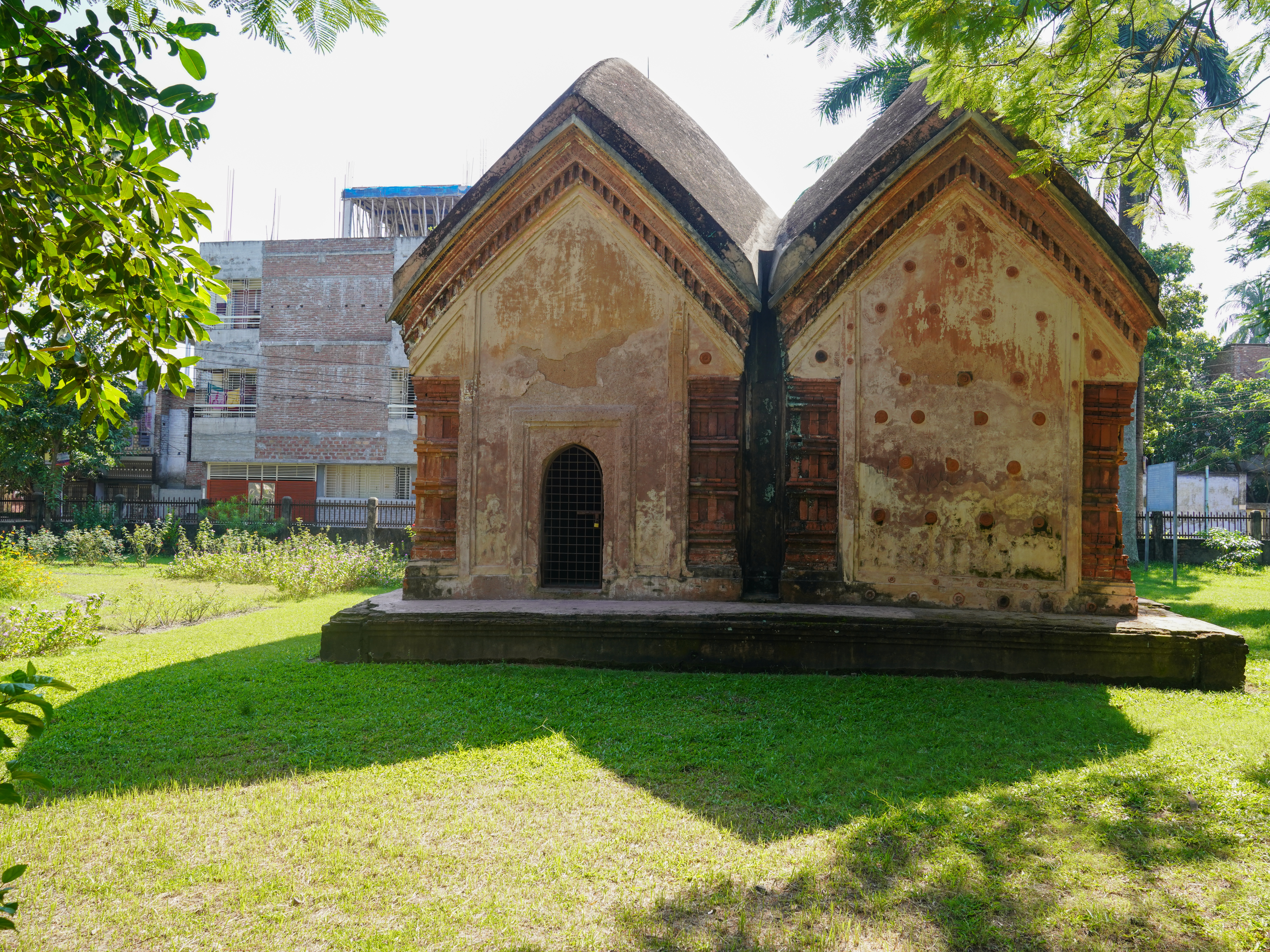
In the picture, the "western chala" (garbhagriha) is seen on the left side and the "eastern chala" (mandapa) on the right side.

The interior and exterior of the Gopinath temple have been largely damaged, especially the terracotta decorations. In two rooms, the temple incorporates elements of the early chala style with its sloping roof, which was common in Hindu temples of Bengal built during this period.

The Gopinath temple is a simple Jor-Bangla temple, where two do-chala structures joined to form a single continuous chala. The do-chala on the eastern side serves as the mandapa and the do-chala on the western side serves as the garbhagriha. The temple is built on a slightly curved platform built of bricks. The platform is larger in area than the floor of temple, and extends all around.

The temple has three arched entrances, supported by 4 columns. Tapering voussoirs are observed on the exterior of arches, which are made of brick cut. The two chambers of the temple–garbhagriha and mandapa–have a total of 16 pillars, 8 each respectively.

The temple measures 7.92 × 7.81 square meters and stands facing east. The length and width of the chamber mandapa are 7.92 metres (26.0 ft) and 7.31 metres (24.0 ft) respectively, while the length and width of the chamber garbhagriha are 6.12 metres (20.1 ft) and 2.28 metres (7.5 ft) respectively. The height of the temple is 7.01 metres (23.0 ft).

== Artwork ==
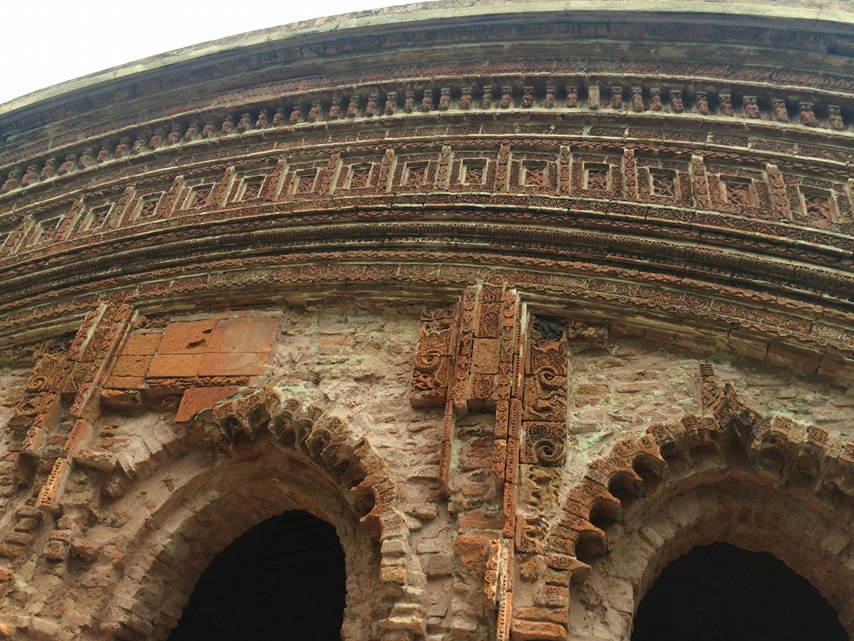
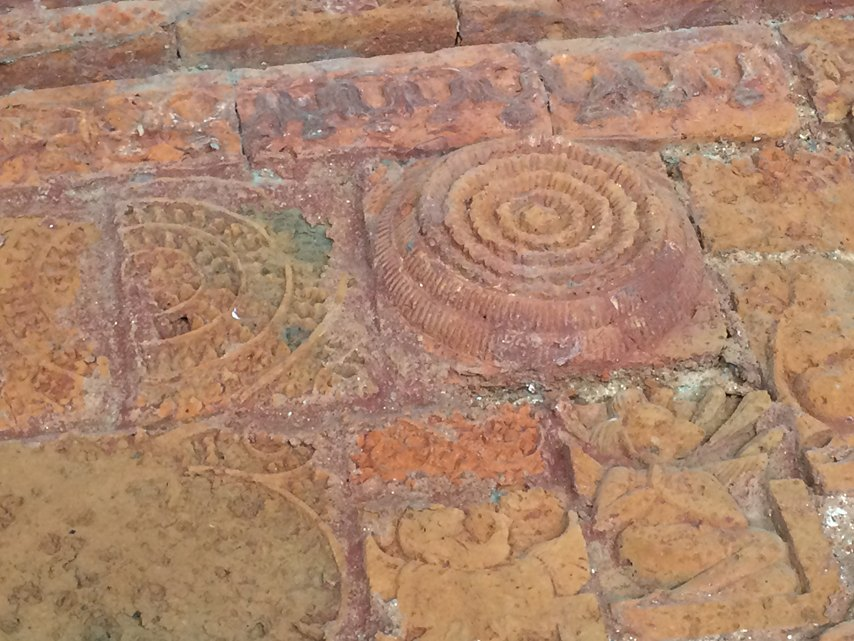
Left: Most of the terracotta plaques above the arches are missing, Right: A fully bloossomed lotus flower on a terracotta plaque above the entrance to the garbhagriha.

The central theme of the temple decoration is the battle between Rama and Ravana's army. At present there are not many terracotta plaques remaining in the left and central arches. However, a comparison with older images shows both groups fighting with bow and arrow, swords, and spears. According to images taken by the Archaeological Survey of India in the 1930s, the terracotta plaques set in the central arch depicts Ravana as Dashanan shooting arrows at Rama's army. Most of the decorative bricks of the columns are missing or have been damaged.

The lowest level (base frieze) of temple facade depicts secular scenes through terracotta artwork. A hunting scene is depicted on the left side of the lowest level, with a team led by dogs followed by men on horseback; at the end of the path musicians are playing drums. The panel on the far right corner shows a nobleman (respectable person) being served a hookah by his servant. Another panel depicts a man admiring his beloved.

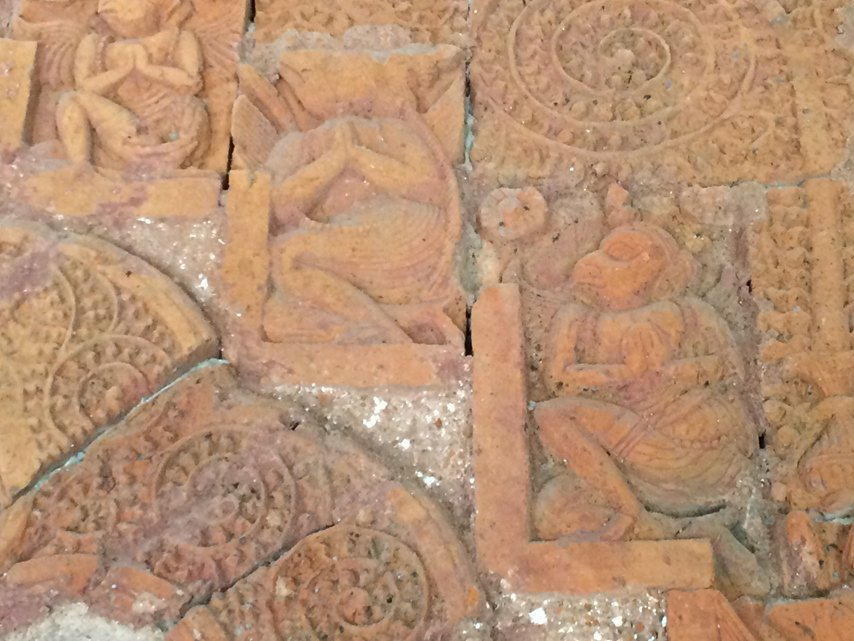
Garuda kneeling with folded hands.

The ornamentation around the arched entrance to the garbhagriha is the only place where the plaque depicts through an anionic representation of Vishnu in form of Garuda, the vahana (mount) of Vishnu. This particular feature points to the Vaishnava affiliation of the temple. The spandrel part of arch (on both sides) has 8 Garuda sculptures. These sculptures show Garuda kneeling with folded hands, a sign of respect to the presiding deity (Vishnu). Apart from Garuda, other motifs used are fully bloomed lotuses and geometric patterns.

== Gallery ==
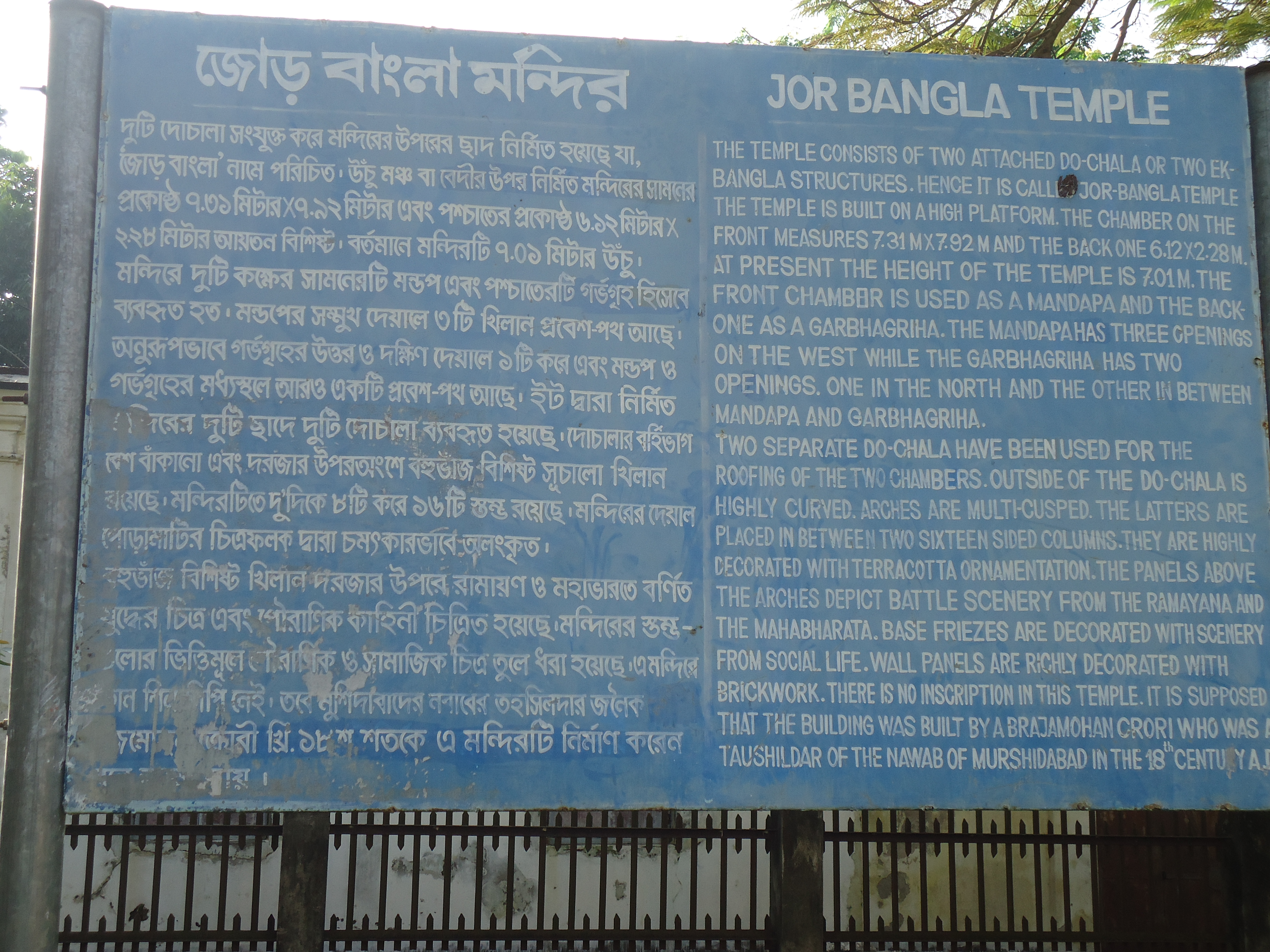
Board with information about Gopinath Temple (Jor Bangla Temple) in Bengali and English language.

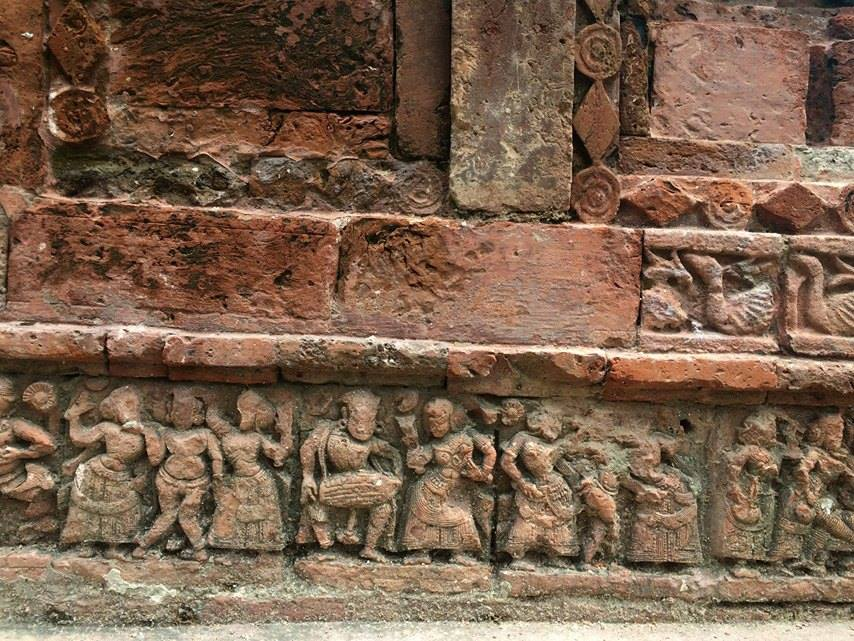
A drummer with a group of dancing women.

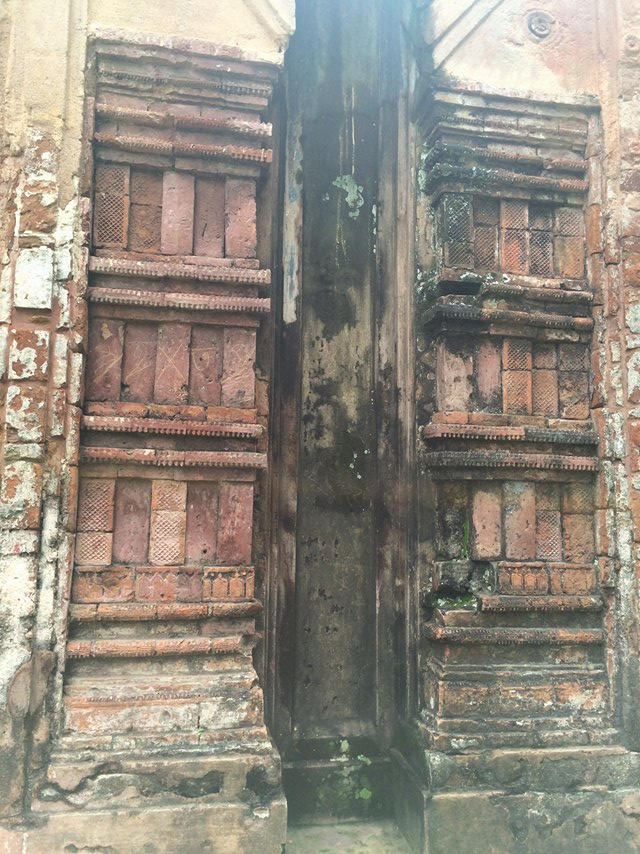
The junction between the mandapam and garbhagriha' of the temple.

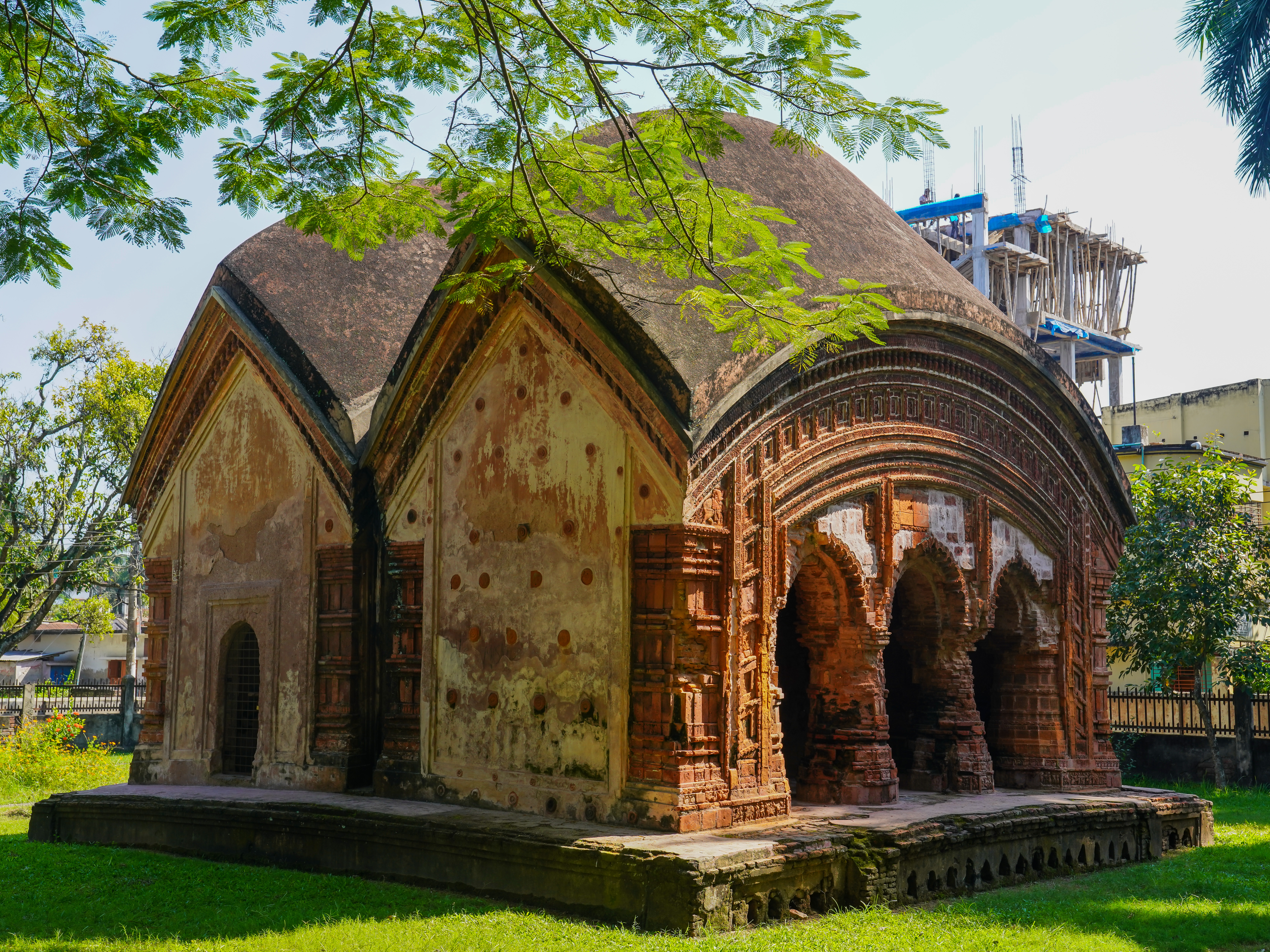
The facade and south side of temple are visible in the picture.

== See also ==
- Bengal temple architecture
- Chala Style
- List of archaeological sites in Bangladesh

== Bibliography ==
- Ray, Mrinmoyee (2012). "Representation in Monument Building and Schematic of Terracotta Narratives: Delving into Some Aspects of Gopinath Jor-Bangla Temple, Pabna, Bangladesh" (PDF). Chitrolekha International Magazine on Art and Design. 2 (1): 100–113. ISSN 2231-4822.
- McCutchion, David J. (1972). Late Mediaeval Temples of Bengal: Origins and Classification. Calcutta: The Asiatic Society. OCLC 1019953308.
- McCutchion, David; Michell, George (1983). Brick Temples of Bengal : From the Archives of David McCutchion / Edited by George Michell. Princeton University Press. ISBN 0-691-04010-9.
