= Nabagram (community development block) =

- Community development block
- Interactive map of Nabagram
- Coordinates: 24.0706034°N 88.0389404°E
- Country: India
- State: West Bengal
- District: Murshidabad

Government
  - Type: Federal democracy

Area
  - Total: 305.61 km^{2} (118.00 sq mi)
- Elevation: 18 m (59 ft)

Population (2011)
  - Total: 227,586
  - Density: 744.69/km^{2} (1,928.7/sq mi)

Languages
  - Official: Bengali, English

Literacy
  - Literacy (2011): 70.83%
- Time zone: UTC+5:30 (IST)
- PIN: 742184(Nabagram)
- Telephone/STD code: 03482
- ISO 3166 code: IN-WB
- Vehicle registration: WB-57, WB-58
- Lok Sabha constituency: Jangipur
- Vidhan Sabha constituency: Nabagram
- Website: murshidabad.gov.in

Nabagram is a community development block that forms an administrative division in the Lalbag subdivision of Murshidabad district in the Indian state of West Bengal.

== Geography ==
Maharul, one of the constituent panchayats of Nabagram block, is located at 24°04′14″N 88°02′20″E.

Nabagram CD block is bounded by Sagardighi CD block in the north, Murshidabad-Jiaganj and Berhampore CD blocks in the east, Khargram CD block in the south and Rampurhat II CD block, in Birbhum district, in the west.

Nabagram CD block lies in the Rarh region in Murshidabad district. The Bhagirathi River splits the district into two natural physiographic regions – Rarh on the west and Bagri on the east. The Rarh region is undulating and contains mostly clay and lateritic clay based soil. As the Rajmahal hills slopes gently down from adjoining Jharkhand it forms the Nabagram plain at the lowest edge of its elevation in this region. The eastern slope of the region is characterised by the existence of numerous cliffs and bluffs.

The Rarh region or the western part of the district is drained by the right bank tributaries of the Bhagirathi, flowing down from the hilly / plateau region of Santhal Pargana division in neighbouring Jharkhand. The Farakka Barrage regulates the flow of water into the Bhagirathi through the feeder canal. Thereafter, it is fed with the discharge from the Mayurakshi system. About 1,800 km^{2} of area in the neighbourhood of Kandi town is flooded by the combined discharge of the Mayurakshi, Dwarka, Brahmani, Gambhira, Kopai and Bakreshwar – the main contributor being the Mayurakshi. Certain other areas in the western sector also get flooded.

Nabagram CD block has an area of 306.63 km^{2}. It has 1 panchayat samity, 10 gram panchayats, 155 gram sansads (village councils), 118 mouzas and 109 inhabited villages. Nabagram police station serves this block. Headquarters of this CD block is at Nabagram.

Gram panchayats in Nabagram block/ panchayat samiti are: Amarkunda, Gurapashla, Hozbibidanga, Kiriteswari, Maharul, Nabagram, Narayanpur, Panchagram, Rasulpur and Shibpur.

== Demographics ==
=== Population ===
According to the 2011 Census of India, Nabagram CD block had a total population of 227,586, all of which were rural. There were 116,134 (51%) males and 111,452 (49%) females. The population in the age range 0-6 years was 28,900. Scheduled Castes numbered 56,622 (24.88%) and Scheduled Tribes numbered 16,770 (7.37%).

As per 2001 census, Nabagram block has a total population of 196,585, out of which 100,491 were males and 96,074 were females. Nabagram block registered a population growth of 22.75 per cent during the 1991-2001 decade. Decadal growth for the district was 23.70 per cent. Decadal growth in West Bengal was 17.84 per cent.

The decadal growth of population in Nabagram CD block in 2001-2011 was 15.76%.

=== Villages ===
Large villages in Nabagram CD block were (2011 population figures in brackets): Nimgram (4,056), Chupar (5,367), Sahebnagar (4,094), Panchgram (17,137), Rasulpur (9,954), Singar (5,200), Gura (6,802), Nabagram (6,939), Rajkhanda (4,005), Bilbari (4,142), and Dafarpur (5,243).

=== Literacy ===
As per the 2011 census, the total number of literates in Nabagram CD block was 140,735 (70.83% of the population over 6 years) out of which males numbered 77,534 (76.44% of the male population over 6 years) and females numbered 63,201 (64.98% of the female population over 6 years). The gender disparity (the difference between female and male literacy rates) was 11.46%.

See also – List of West Bengal districts ranked by literacy rate

Literacy in CD blocks of
Murshidabad district
Jangipur subdivision
Farakka – 59.75%
Samserganj – 54.98%
Suti I – 58.40%
Suti II – 55.23%
Raghunathganj I – 64.49%
Raghunathganj II – 61.17%
Sagardighi – 65.27%
Lalbag subdivision
Murshidabad-Jiaganj – 69.14%
Bhagawangola I - 57.22%
Bhagawangola II – 53.48%
Lalgola– 64.32%
Nabagram – 70.83%
Sadar subdivision
Berhampore – 73.51%
Beldanga I – 70.06%
Beldanga II – 67.86%
Hariharpara – 69.20%
Naoda – 66.09%
Kandi subdivision
Kandi – 65.13%
Khargram – 63.56%
Burwan – 68.96%
Bharatpur I – 62.93%
Bharatpur II – 66.07%
Domkol subdivision
Domkal – 55.89%
Raninagar I – 57.81%
Raninagar II – 54.81%
Jalangi – 58.73%
Source: 2011 Census: CD Block Wise
Primary Census Abstract Data

=== Language and religion ===
Religion in Nabagram CD block (2011)
Islam	52.59%
Hinduism	45.17%
Christianity	1.65%
Sarnaism	0.49%
Other or not stated	0.10%

In the 2011 census, Muslims numbered 119,693 and formed 52.59% of the population in Nabagram CD block. Hindus numbered 102,810 and formed 45.17% of the population. Others numbered 5,083 and formed 2.24% of the population. In Nabagram CD block while the proportion of Muslims increased from 48.53% in 1991 to 50.88% in 2001, the proportion of Hindus declined from 50.15% in 1991 to 47.42% in 2001.

Murshidabad district had 4,707,573 Muslims who formed 66.27% of the population, 2,359,061 Hindus who formed 33.21% of the population, and 37, 173 persons belonging to other religions who formed 0.52% of the population, in the 2011 census. While the proportion of Muslim population in the district increased from 61.40% in 1991 to 63.67% in 2001, the proportion of Hindu population declined from 38.39% in 1991 to 35.92% in 2001.

Languages of Nabagram CD block (2011)
1. Bengali (92.2%)
2. Santali (7.06%)
3. Others (0.78%)

At the time of the 2011 census, 92.16% of the population spoke Bengali and 7.06% Santali as their first language.

== Rural poverty ==
As per the Human Development Report 2004 for West Bengal, the rural poverty ratio in Murshidabad district was 46.12%. Purulia, Bankura and Birbhum districts had higher rural poverty ratios. These estimates were based on Central Sample data of NSS 55th round 1999-2000.

== Economy ==
=== Livelihood ===
In Nabagram CD block in 2011, amongst the class of total workers, cultivators numbered 18,418 and formed 23.60%, agricultural labourers numbered 42,548 and formed 54.52%, household industry workers numbered 3,383 and formed 4.33% and other workers numbered 13,697 and formed 17.55%.

=== Infrastructure ===
There are 109 inhabited villages in Nabagram CD block. 100% villages have power supply and drinking water supply. 26 villages (23.85%) have post offices. 104 villages (95.41%) have telephones (including landlines, public call offices and mobile phones). 27 villages (24.77%) have a pucca approach road and 39 villages (35.78%) have transport communication (includes bus service, rail facility and navigable waterways). 19 villages (17.43%) have agricultural credit societies and 8 villages (7.34%) have banks.

=== Agriculture ===
Persons engaged in agriculture
in Nabagram CD block
1. Bargadars (7.68%)
2. Patta holders (14.9%)
3. Small farmers (6.61%)
4. Marginal farmers (27.3%)
5. Agricultural labourers (43.5%)

From 1977 onwards major land reforms took place in West Bengal. Land in excess of land ceiling was acquired and distributed amongst the peasants. Following land reforms land ownership pattern has undergone transformation. In 2013-14, persons engaged in agriculture in Nabagram CD block could be classified as follows: bargadars 7,518 (7.68%), patta (document) holders 14,628 (14.94%), small farmers (possessing land between 1 and 2 hectares) 6,470 (6.61%), marginal farmers (possessing land up to 1 hectare) 26,722 (27.30%) and agricultural labourers 42,548 (43.47%).

Nabagram CD block had 120 fertiliser depots, 3 seed stores and 51 fair price shops in 2013-14.

In 2013-14, Nabagram CD block produced 2,958 tonnes of Aman paddy, the main winter crop from 1,180 hectares, 40,180 tonnes of Boro paddy (spring crop) from 14,606 hectares, 647 tonnes of Aus paddy (summer crop) from 316 hectares, 280 tonnes of wheat from 133 hectares, 15,583 tonnes of jute from 941 hectares, 11,079 tonnes of potatoes from 381 hectares and 3,295 tonnes of sugar cane from 59 hectares. It also produced pulses and oilseeds.

In 2013-14, the total area irrigated in Nabagram CD block was 17.427 hectares, out of which 2,193 hectares were irrigated with tank water, 1,734 hectares by deep tube well and 13,500 hectares by other means.

=== Silk and handicrafts ===
Murshidabad is famous for its silk industry since the Middle Ages. There are three distinct categories in this industry, namely (i) Mulberry cultivation and silkworm rearing (ii) Peeling of raw silk (iii) Weaving of silk fabrics. Prime locations for weaving (silk and cotton) are: Khargram, Raghunathganj I, Nabagram, Beldanga I, Beldanga II and Raninagar-I CD blocks.

Ivory carving is an important cottage industry from the era of the Nawabs. The main areas where this industry has flourished are Khagra and Jiaganj. 99% of ivory craft production is exported. In more recent years sandalwood etching has become more popular than ivory carving. Bell metal and Brass utensils are manufactured in large quantities at Khagra, Berhampore, Kandi and Jangipur. Beedi making has flourished in the Jangipur subdivision.

=== Banking ===
In 2013-14, Nabagram CD block had offices of 7 commercial banks and 7 gramin banks.

=== Backward Regions Grant Fund ===
Murshidabad district is listed as a backward region and receives financial support from the Backward Regions Grant Fund. The fund, created by the Government of India, is designed to redress regional imbalances in development. As of 2012, 272 districts across the country were listed under this scheme. The list includes 11 districts of West Bengal.

== Transport ==
Nabagram CD block has 9 originating/ terminating bus routes. The nearest railway station is 20 km from the CD block headquarters.

Baharampur-Lalgola Road and Rabindra Sarani-Siraj-ud-daulah Road pass through this block.

State Highway 7 running from Rajgram (in Birbhum district) to Midnapore (in Paschim Medinipur district) passes through this CD Block.

== Education ==
In 2013-14, Nabagram CD block had 150 primary schools with 13,993 students, 19 middle schools with 1,423 students, 11 high schools with 7,762 students and 15 higher secondary schools with 20,769 students. Nabagram CD block had 1 general college with 918 students, three technical/professional institutions with 283 students and 496 institutions for special and non-formal education with 15,063 students.

Nabagram Amar Chand Kundu College was established in 2009 at Nabagram. Affiliated with the University of Kalyani, it offers courses in Bengali and history.

In Nabagram CD block, amongst the 109 inhabited villages, 3 villages do not have a school, 54 villages have more than 1 primary school, 48 villages have at least 1 primary and 1 middle school and 23 villages have at least 1 middle and 1 secondary school.

== Culture ==
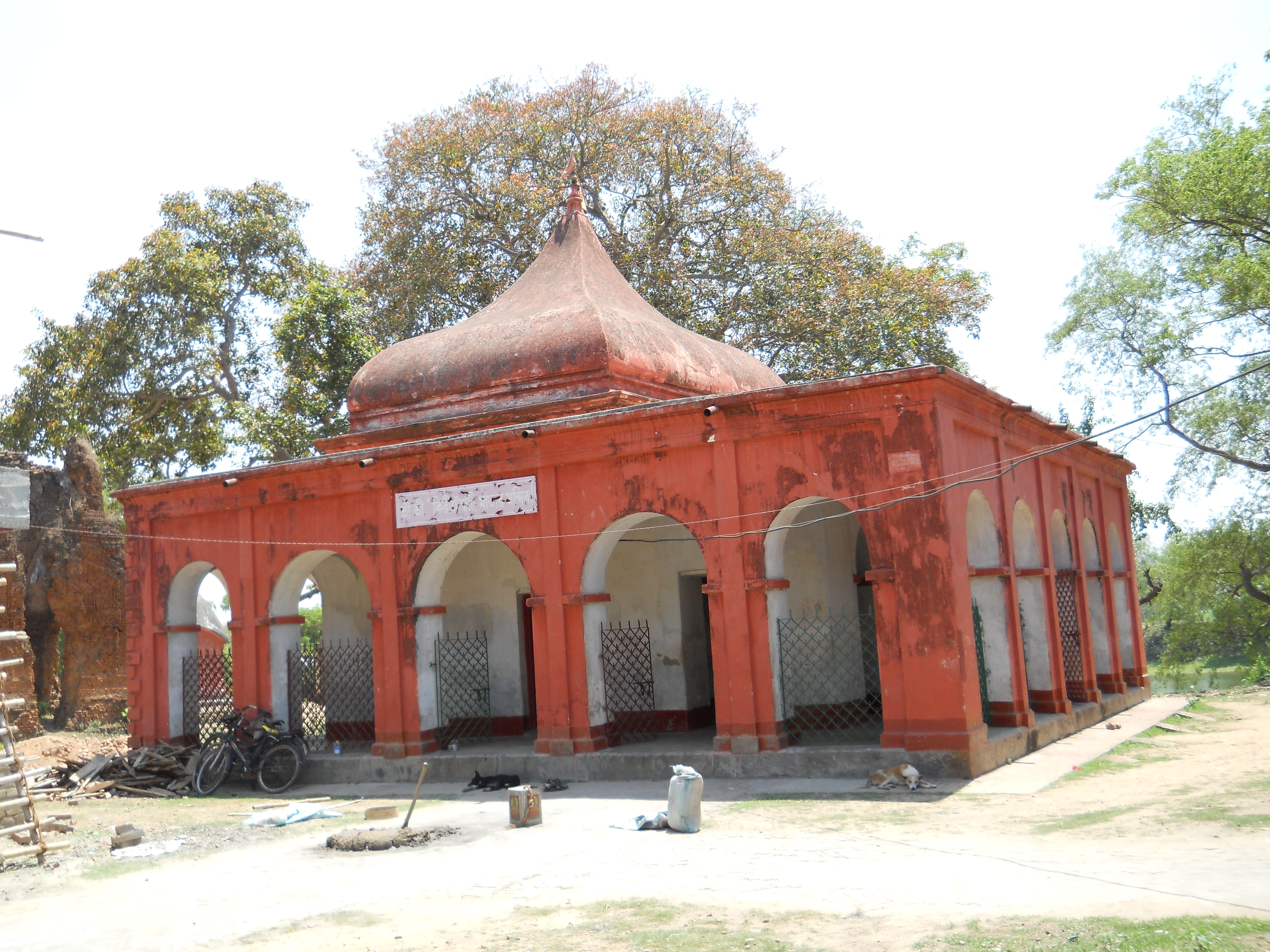
Kiriteswari Temple

Kiriteswari Temple: Located in Kiritkona village it is one of the 51 Shakta pithas.

== Healthcare ==
In 2014, Nabagram CD block had 1 block primary health centre, 5 primary health centres and 2 private nursing homes with total 45 beds and 10 doctors (excluding private bodies). It had 31 family welfare subcentres. 20,709 patients were treated indoor and 227,399 patients were treated outdoor in the hospitals, health centres and subcentres of the CD Block.

Nabagram CD block has Nabagram Block Primary Health Centre at Nabagram, India (with 15 beds), Panchgram Primary Health Centre (with 10 beds), Nimgram-Beluri PHC (with 4 beds), Bagirapara PHC at Rasulpur (with 4 beds) and Kiriteswari PHC (with 6 beds).

Nabagram CD block is one of the areas of Murshidabad district where ground water is affected by a low level of arsenic contamination. The WHO guideline for arsenic in drinking water is 10 mg/ litre, and the Indian Standard value is 50 mg/ litre. All but one of the 26 blocks of Murshidabad district have arsenic contamination above the WHO level, all but two of the blocks have arsenic concentration above the Indian Standard value and 17 blocks have arsenic concentration above 300 mg/litre. The maximum concentration in Nabagram CD block is 40 mg/litre.
