= Nabagram, Dakshin Dinajpur =

Nabagram is a village in Kumarganj, Balurghat subdivision, Dakshin Dinajpur district, West Bengal, India. This village is located at east-north of Dakshin Dinajpur district (India Bangladesh border).
