= Nabagram, Murshidabad =

Nabagram
- Village
- Location in West Bengal, India Nabagram (India)
- Coordinates: 24°11′44.2″N 88°05′49.4″E
- Country: India
- State: West Bengal
- District: Murshidabad

Population (2011)
  - Total: 6,939

Languages
  - Official: Bengali, English
- Time zone: UTC+5:30 (IST)
- ISO 3166 code: IN-WB
- Vehicle registration: WB
- Website: wb.gov.in

Nabagram is a village in the Nabagram CD block in the Lalbag subdivision of Murshidabad district in the Indian state of West Bengal.

== Geography ==
Cities, towns and locations in the Lalbag and Domkal subdivisions, Murshidabad district
M: municipal town, CT: census town, R: rural/ urban centre, H: historical place
Owing to space constraints in the small map, the actual locations in a larger map may vary slightly

=== Location ===
Nabagram is located at 24°11′44.2″N 88°05′49.4″E.

=== Area overview ===
While the Lalbag subdivision is spread across both the natural physiographic regions of the district, Rarh and Bagri, the Domkal subdivision occupies the north-eastern corner of Bagri. In the map alongside, the Ganges/Padma River flows along the northern portion. The border with Bangladesh can be seen in the north and the east. Murshidabad district shares with Bangladesh a porous international border which is notoriously crime prone (partly shown in this map). The Ganges has a tendency to change course frequently, causing severe erosion, mostly along the southern bank. The historic city of Murshidabad, a centre of major tourist attraction, is located in this area. In 1717, when Murshid Quli Khan became Subahdar, he made Murshidabad the capital of Subah Bangla (then Bengal, Bihar and Odisha). The entire area is overwhelmingly rural with over 90% of the population living in the rural areas.

Note: The map alongside presents some of the notable locations in the subdivisions. All places marked in the map are linked in the larger full screen map.

== Civic administration ==
=== Police station ===
Nabagram police station has jurisdiction over Nabagram CD block.

=== CD block HQ ===
The headquarters of Nabagram CD block are located at Nabagram.

=== Notable Personalities ===
Advaita Acharya (1434–1559) was a prominent figure in the early Gaudiya Vaishnava tradition and is closely associated with Nabagram in Bengal, where he was born to Sri Kubera Pandit and Srimati Nabha Devi. Revered as an incarnation of both Maha Vishnu and Sadashiva within Gaudiya Vaishnavism, Advaita Acharya played a foundational role in the spiritual and social life of the region.

Advaita Acharya is best known as one of the key members of the Panchatattva—the five principal associates of Sri Chaitanya Mahaprabhu—and is hailed for his fervent devotion, which, according to traditional accounts, prompted Lord Chaitanya’s advent. He was a disciple of Srila Madhavendra Puri and earned the title “Acharya” from his studies of the Vedic scriptures under the tutelage of Santacharya in Phullavati village.

Spending much of his adult life in Shantipur, near Nabagram, Advaita Acharya hosted regular gatherings of Vaishnava devotees and actively spread the practice of bhakti (devotional service) to Krishna. These congregations centered on scriptural discourse drawn from texts such as the Bhagavad Gita and Srimad Bhagavatam. As a respected spiritual teacher, he is credited with guiding many followers—including members of Lord Chaitanya’s family—toward the path of devotion and the congregational chanting of the holy names.

Advaita Acharya’s long life—he is said to have lived for 125 years—was marked by extensive pilgrimages, including travels to Vrindavan and other sacred places. He famously worshiped shaligram shilas (sacred stones) with Ganges water and Tulasi leaves, imploring the Supreme Lord to deliver people from the degradations of the age of Kali. Gaudiya Vaishnava tradition holds that his deep devotion and ardent prayers compelled the divine manifestation of Chaitanya Mahaprabhu.

Advaita Acharya’s principal deities and family line continue to be honored in Shantipur and surrounding areas, preserving his legacy as a revered saint and teacher linked indelibly to Nabagram’s spiritual heritage.

== Demographics ==
According to the 2011 Census of India, Nabagram had a total population of 6,939 of which 3,535 (51%) were males and 3,404 (49%) were females. Population in the age range 0–6 years was 808. The total number of literate persons in Nabagram was 4,624 (75% of the population over 6 years).

== Education ==
Nabagram Amar Chand Kundu College was established in 2009 at Nabagram. Affiliated with the University of Kalyani it offers courses in Bengali and history.

== Healthcare ==
Nabagram Block Primary Health Centre functions with 15 beds at Nabagram.
