= Kiriteswari Temple =

Hindu temple in West Bengal, India

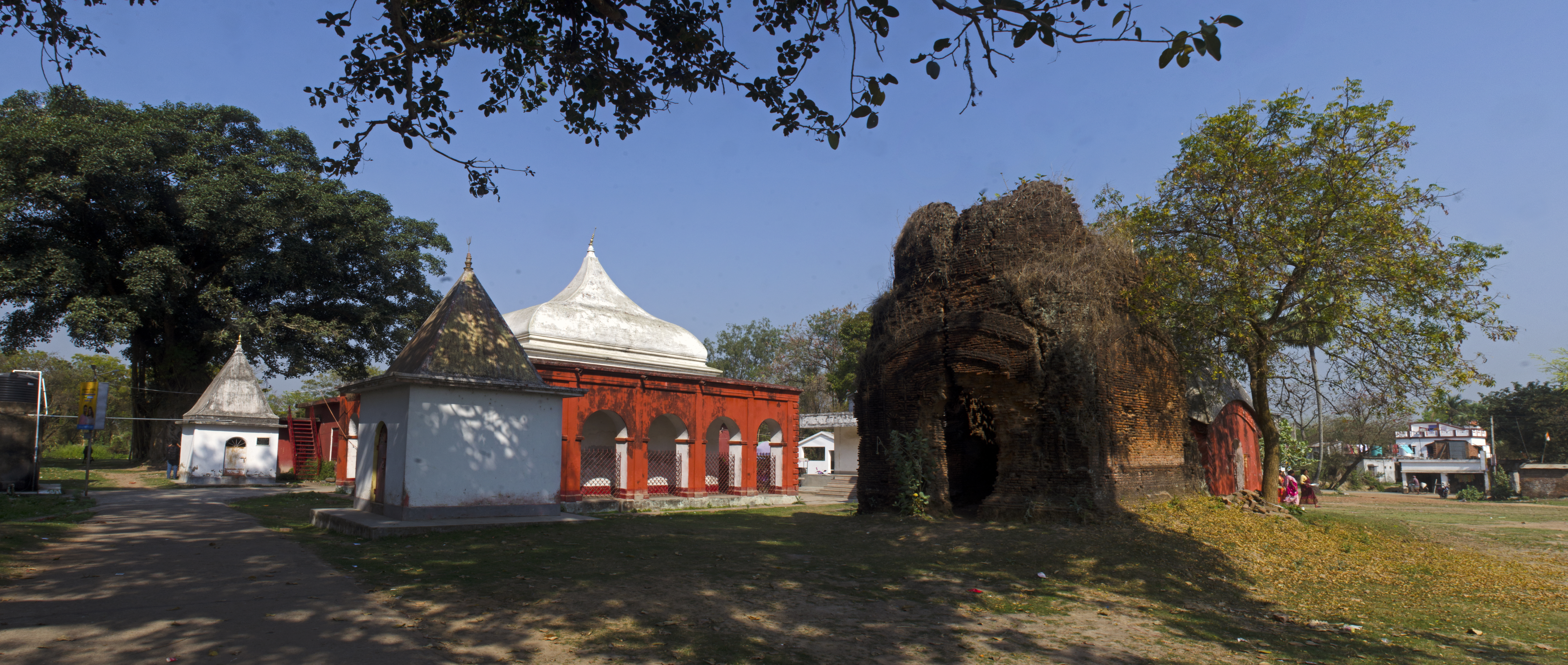
- Kiriteshwari Temple

- Location within West Bengal Location within India

Religion
- Affiliation: Hinduism

Location
- Location: Kiritkona; Murshidabad
- State: West Bengal
- Country: India
- Interactive map of Kiriteswari Temple
- Coordinates: 24°12′0″N 88°13′7″E

Kiriteswari Temple is situated in Kiritkona village under the Nabagram CD block in the Lalbag subdivision of Murshidabad district in the state of West Bengal. This is one of the Shakta pithas among the 51 pithas. In September 2023 this area was selected as the best tourism village of India.

== Geography ==
Cities, towns and locations in the Lalbag and Domkal subdivisions, Murshidabad district
M: municipal town, CT: census town, R: rural/ urban centre, H: historical place
Owing to space constraints in the small map, the actual locations in a larger map may vary slightly

=== Location ===
Kiritswari Temple is located at 24°12′0″N 88°13′7″E.

It is located in Kiritkona village near the bank of Bhagirathi River, in Lalbag subdivision at Murshidabad district.

== History ==
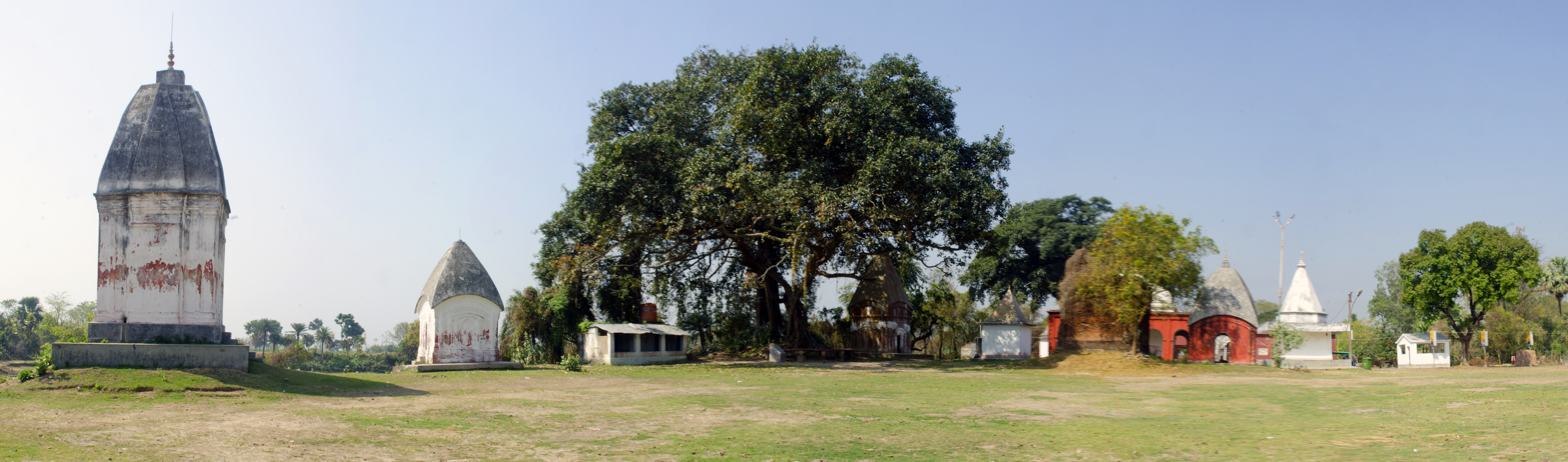
Panoramic view of Kiriteshwari Temple Complex

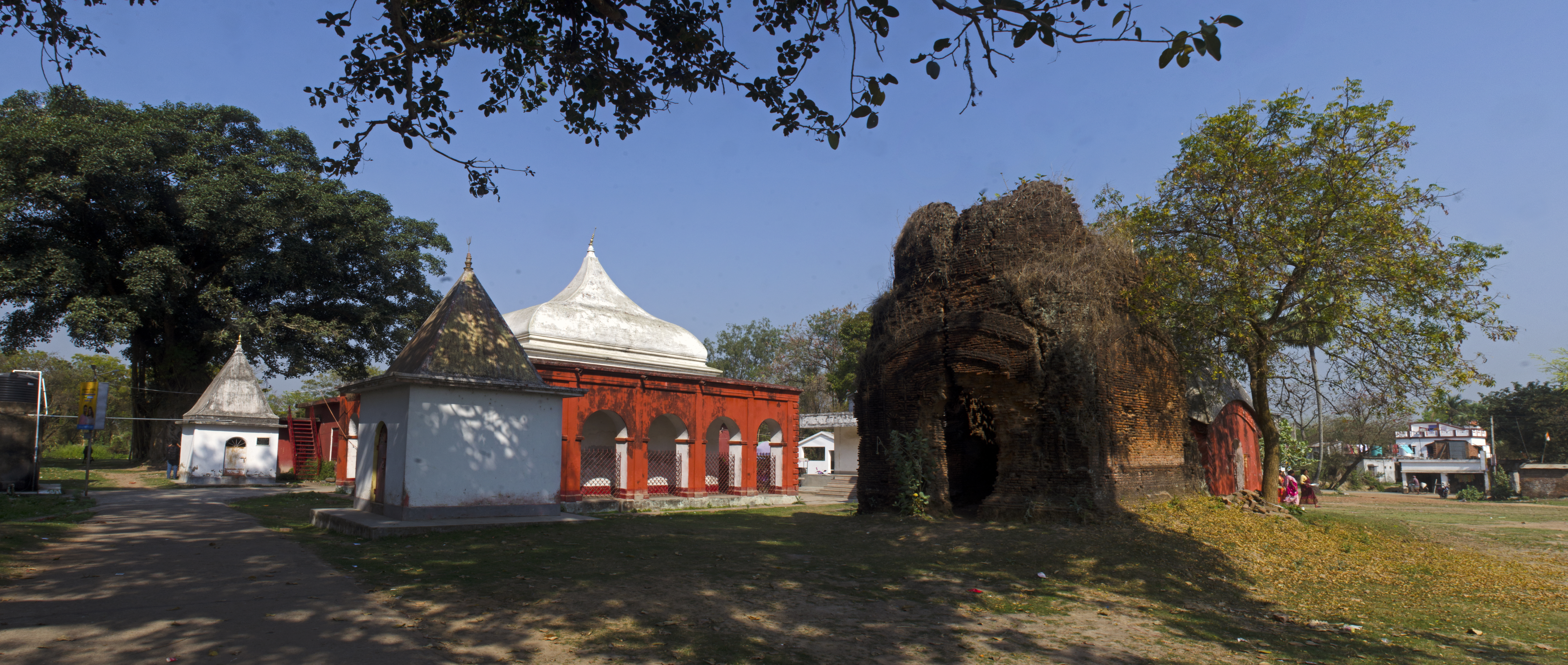
Kiriteshwari Temple Complex

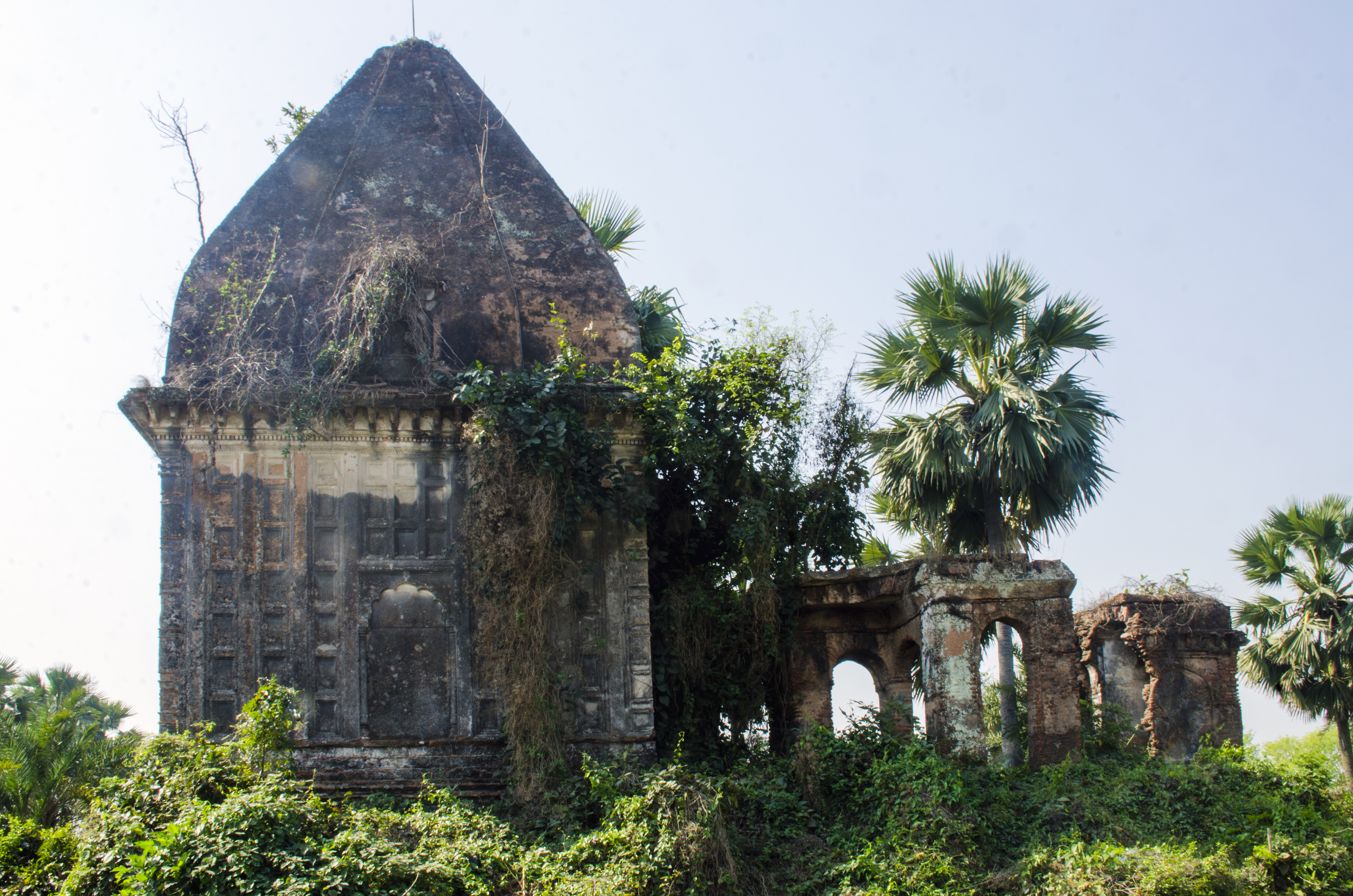
Old temple of Kiriteshwari

According to the Puranas or Hindu mythology the place is named as Kiriteswari. The residing deity is known by the name Devi Kiriteshwari (also known as Maa Kiriteshwari or Maa Kiriteshwari Kali).The temple marks the spot where the crown (or “Kirit”) of Goddess Sati is believed to have fallen, following her tragic self-immolation and the subsequent journey of Lord Shiva carrying her body.The construction of the temple is more than 1000 years old and this place was considered to be the sleeping place of Mahamaya. Local people call this temple as Mahishamardini. Devi is also worshipped as Mukuteshwari (as her mukut or crown fell) the Holy Goddess. The original Temple was destroyed in 1405. The present temple was re-constructed by Darpanarayan, king of Lalgola in the 19th century and this is the oldest mark of architecture amongst 51 Peethas. It is the oldest temple in the Murshidabad district. There is a legend that Nawab Mir Jafar in his death bed had requested for the holy Charanamrito (the holy water) of Maa Kiriteswari while suffering from leprosy.

== Culture ==
According to David J. McCutchion the Kiriteswari Temple is a small shrine which is basically a char-chala, “but the curve of the cornice has been repeated as a pattern all the way up the roof (eight segments). He also mentions it as a char-chala with an ek-bangla porch.

== Transport ==
The temple is located in Kiritkona village which is popularly known as Kiriteswari. Nabagram-Lalbag Road pass through the village. The nearest railway route is Dahapara Dham railway station (5 km from the village). Lalbag Court Road railway station is near about 3 km from the temple.

== Recognition ==
In September 2023 Union Ministry of Tourism of India declared Kiriteswari as the ‘Best Tourism Village of India 2023.’ The competition was held to promote heritage and cultural tourism in rural India. In 2023, a total of 795 villages across 31 states and Union territories took part in the contest. Kiriteswari emerged as the winner.

== Kiriteswari Temple picture gallery ==
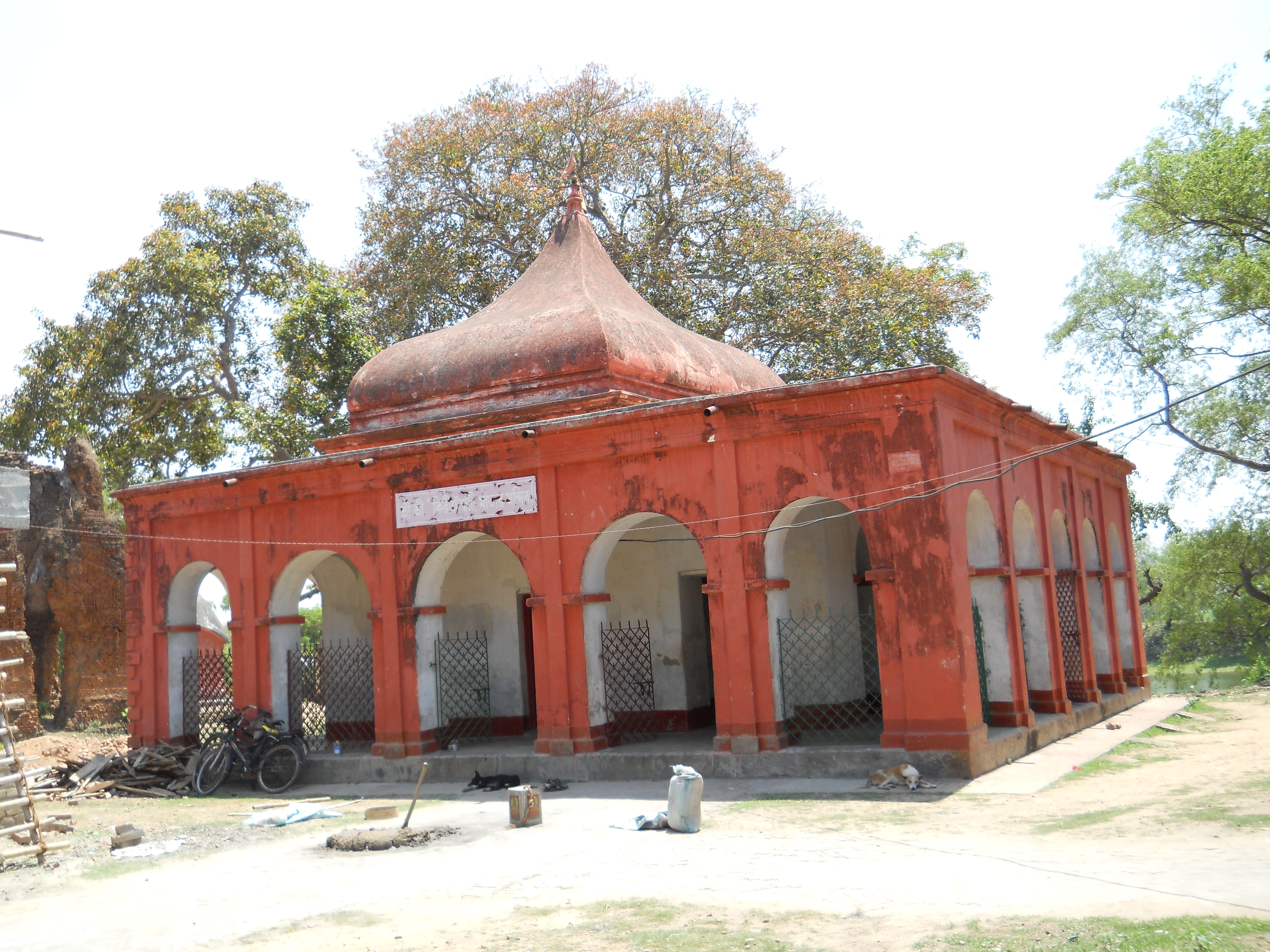
Kiriteswari Temple, Murshidabad, West Bengal

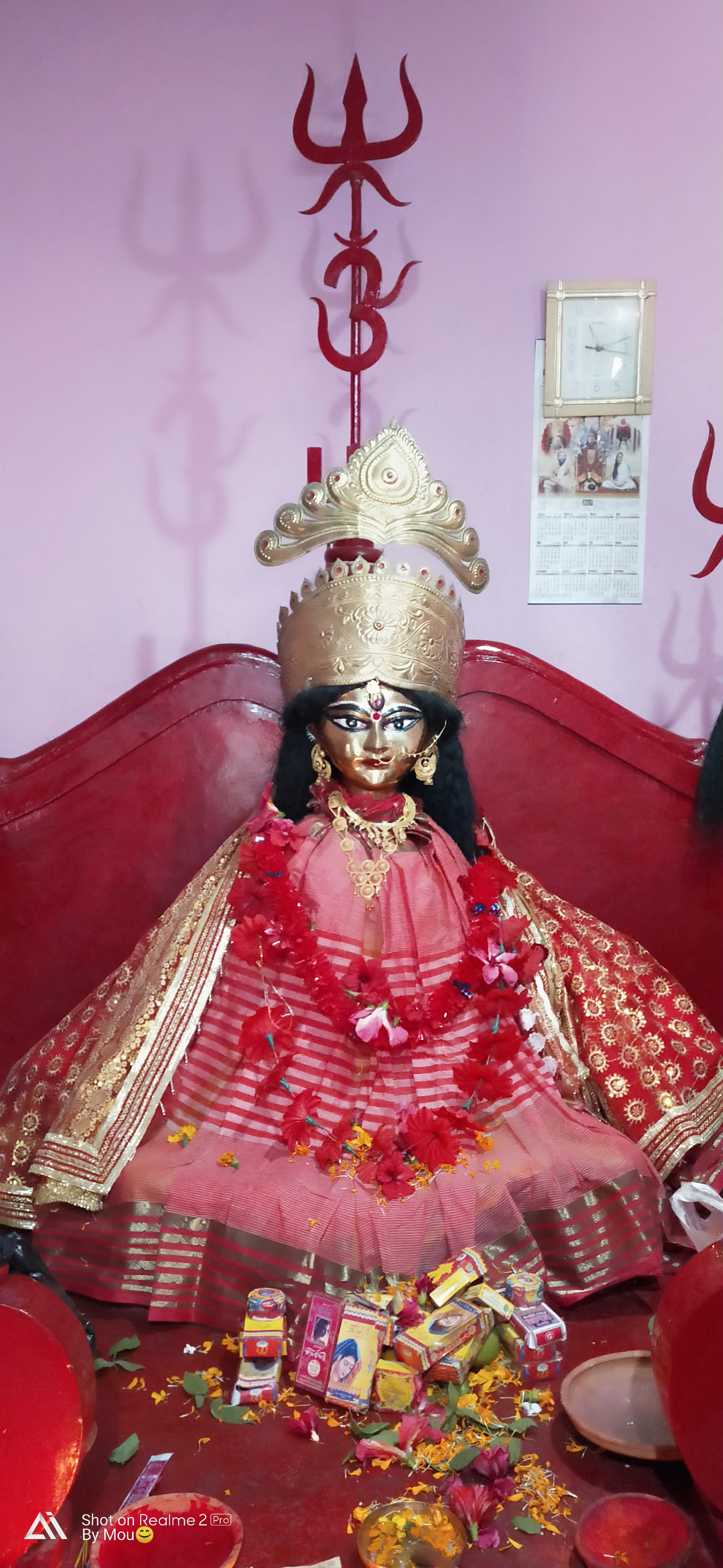
Vigraha of Kiriteswari temple

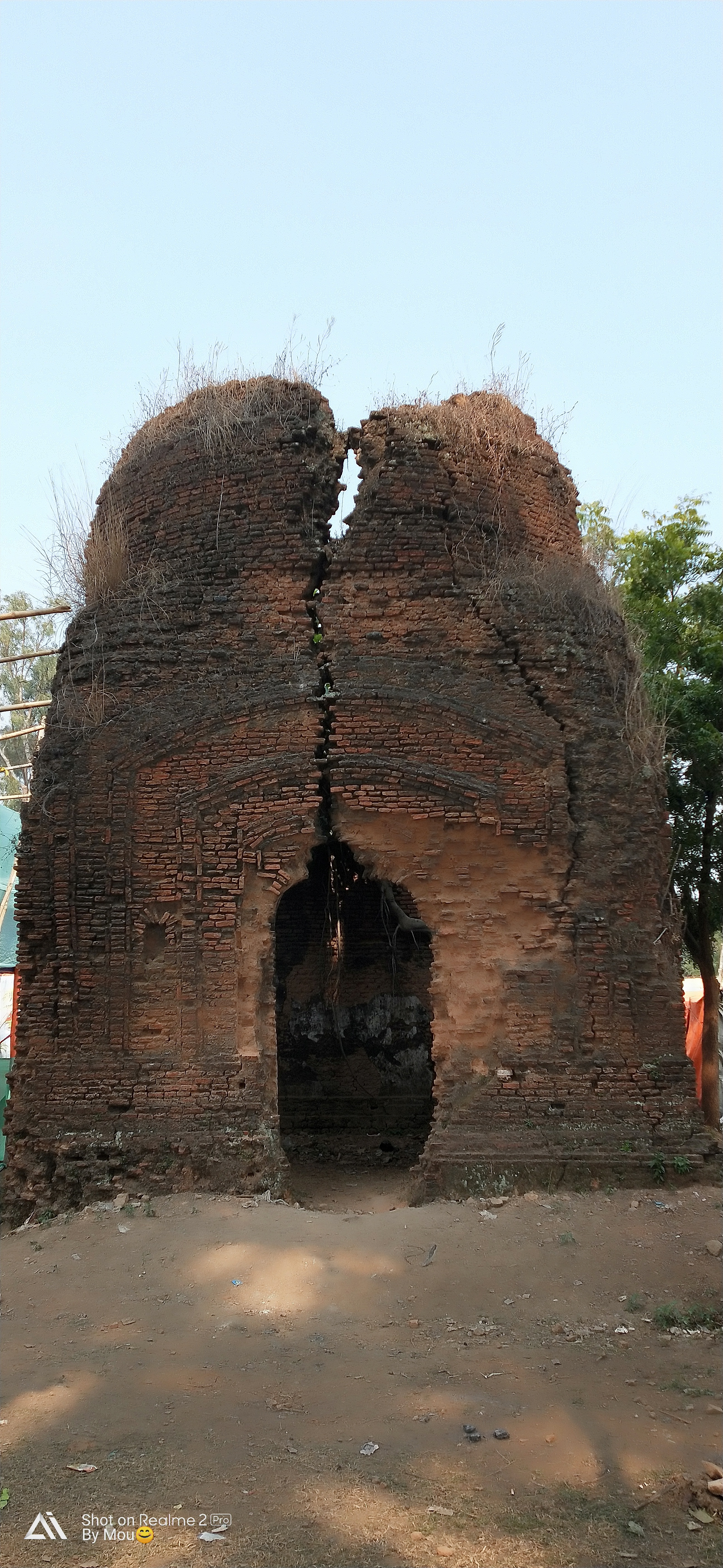
The original Kiriteswari Temple

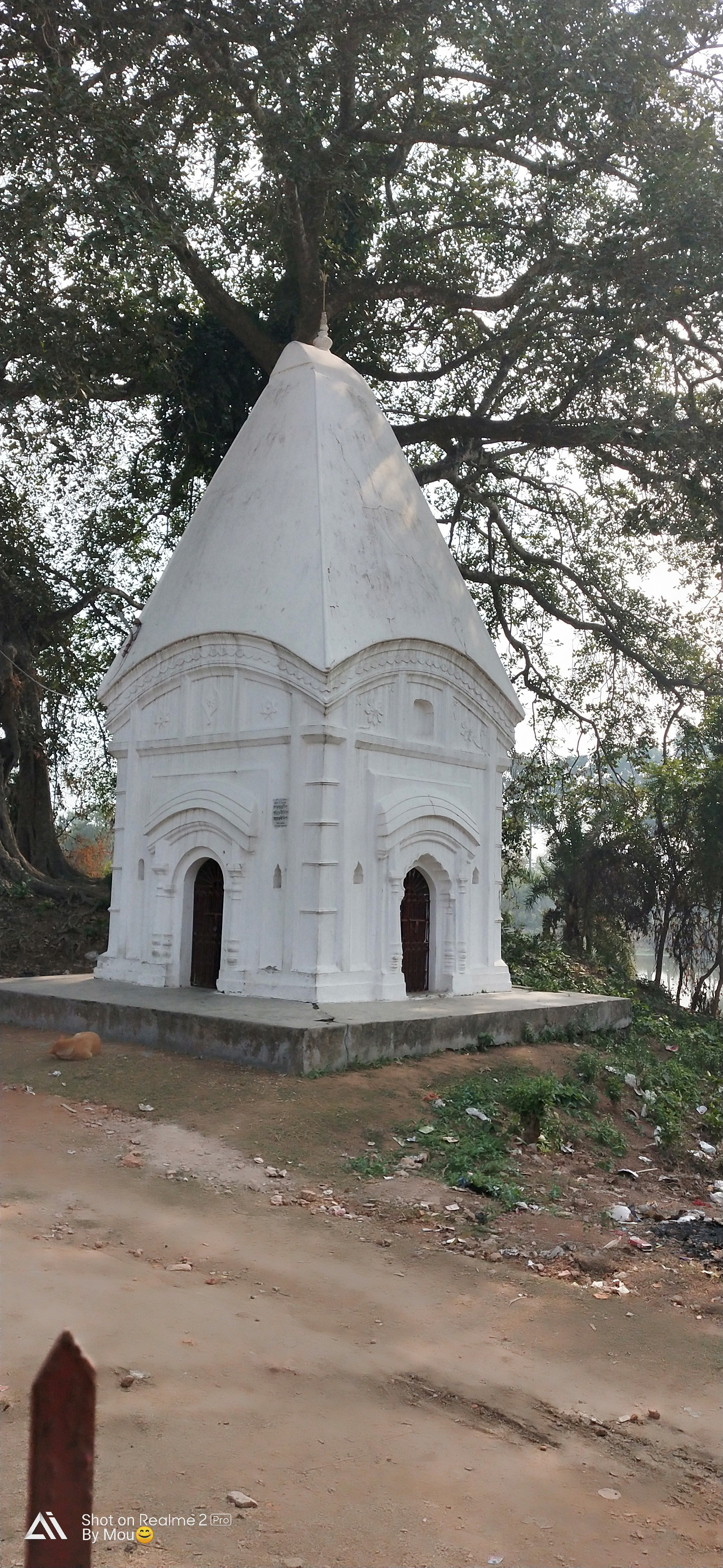
The temple of Vairab
