= Char Bangla Temples =

Temple complex in Murshidabad district

- An ASI Listed Monument
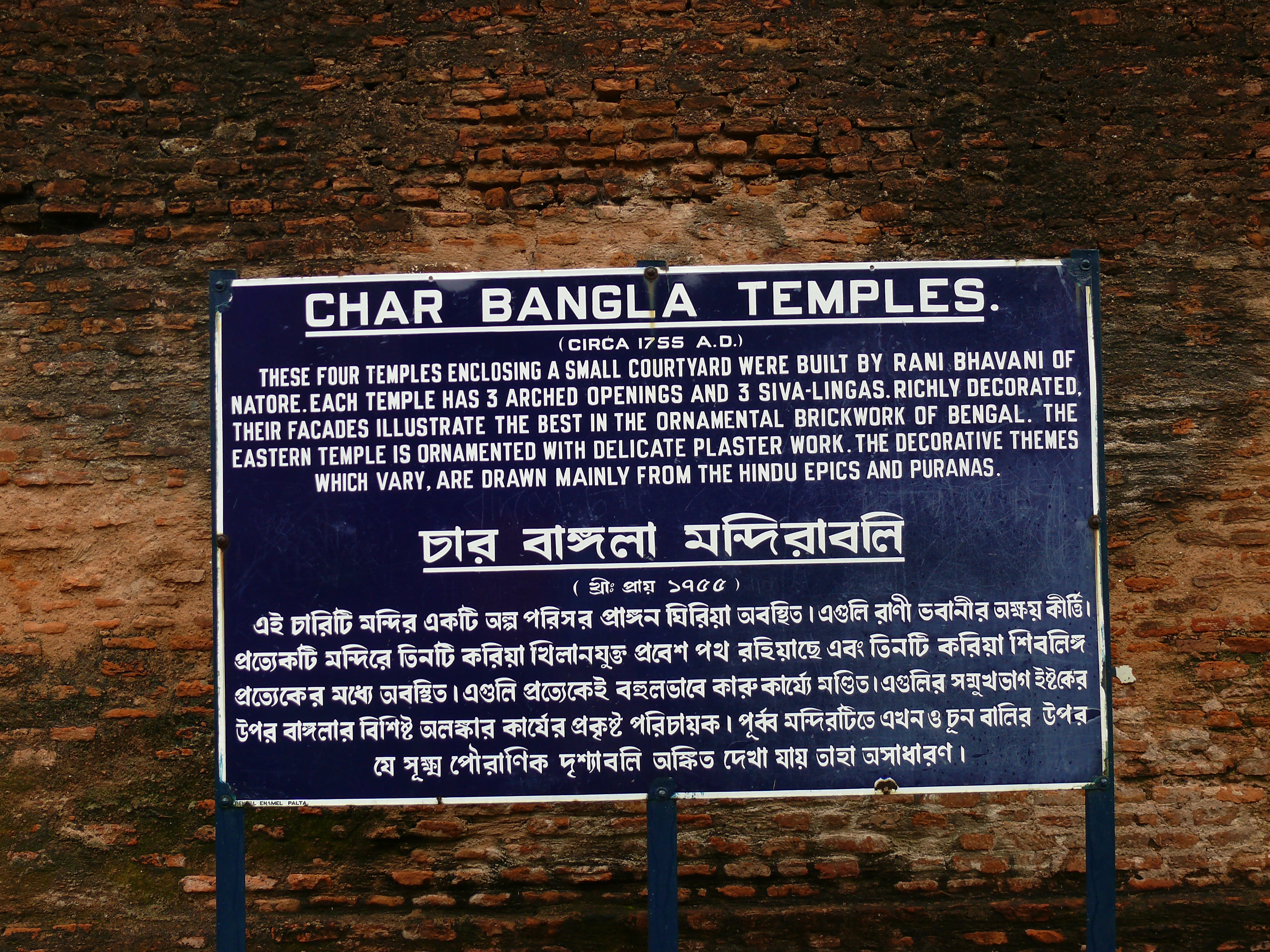
- ASI signage at the Char Bangla Temple complex in Baronagar

- Location within West Bengal Location within India

Religion
- Affiliation: Hinduism

Location
- Location: Baranagar, Murshidabad
- State: West Bengal
- Country: India
- Interactive map of Char Bangla Temples
- Coordinates: 24.2521°N 88.2436°E

Architecture
- Type: Ek-bangla
- Completed: 18th century

Char Bangla Temples, are located at Baranagar in the Murshidabad-Jiaganj CD block in the Lalbag subdivision of Murshidabad district in the Indian state of West Bengal.

== Geography ==
Cities, towns and locations in the Lalbag and Domkal subdivisions, Murshidabad district
M: municipal town, CT: census town, R: rural/ urban centre, H: historical place
Owing to space constraints in the small map, the actual locations in a larger map may vary slightly

=== Location ===
The Char Bangla Temples are located at 24.2521°N 88.2436°E.

== The temples ==
David J. McCutchion mentions the Char Bangla Temples at Baranagar as ek-bangla temples with triple entrance, measuring 31’ x 15–16.5’. The northern temple is dated 1760. Two of the temples have rich terracotta façade, one has incised plaster and the fourth one is plain. He says that apart from the Baranagar group, the ek-bangla is hardly found in West Bengal except in a “cursory form”

According to the List of Monuments of National Importance in West Bengal the Char Bangla group of four Siva Mandirs are ASI listed monuments.

== History ==
The temples were built by Rani Bhabani of Natore. The temples are famous for their exquisite decorations based on either mythology or daily life. The tendency of the Ganges to change course frequently is threatening the existence of these heritage structures. The river, which earlier used to flow some distance away is now within yards from the temples.

== Char Bangla picture gallery ==
=== The temples ===
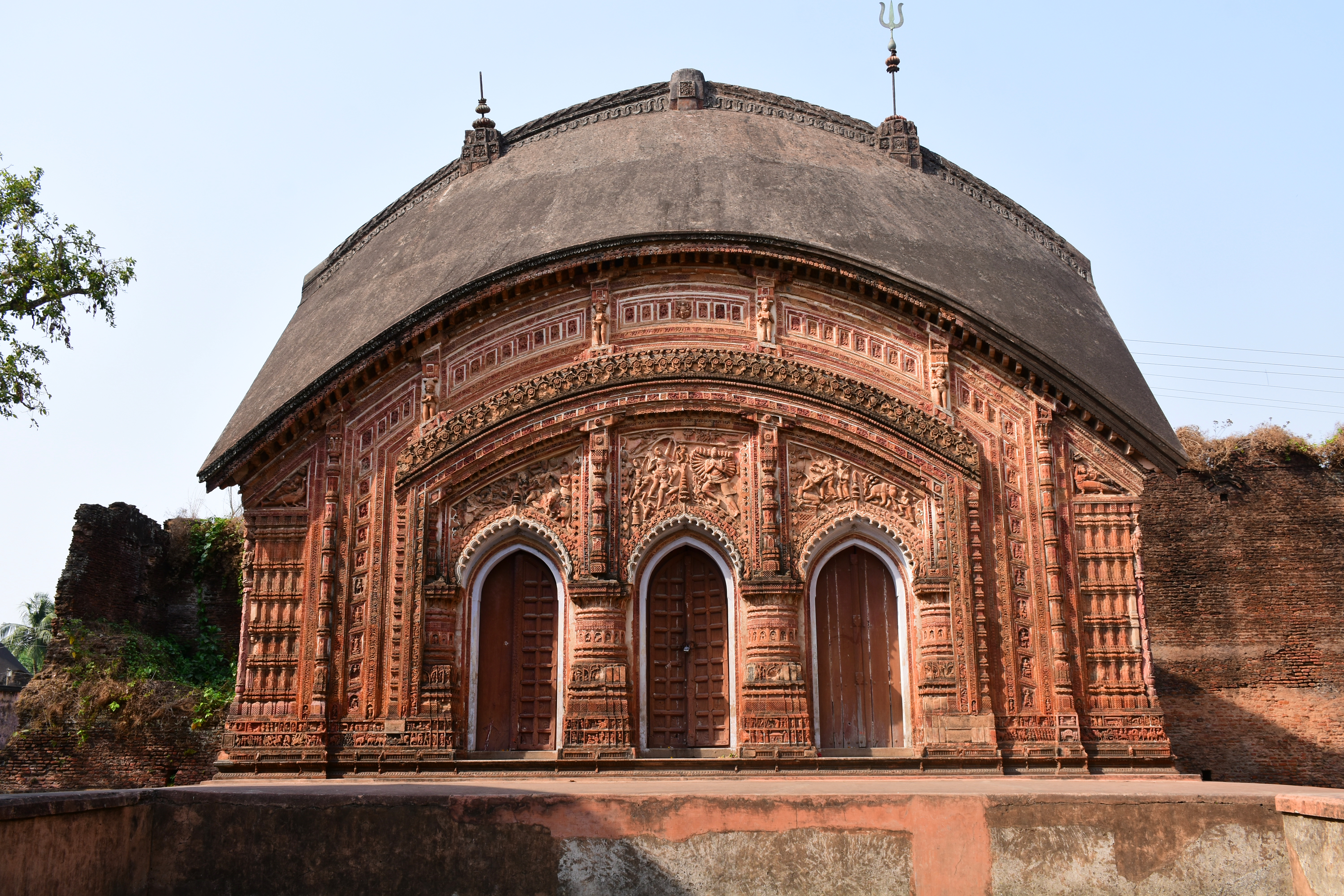
Temple 1

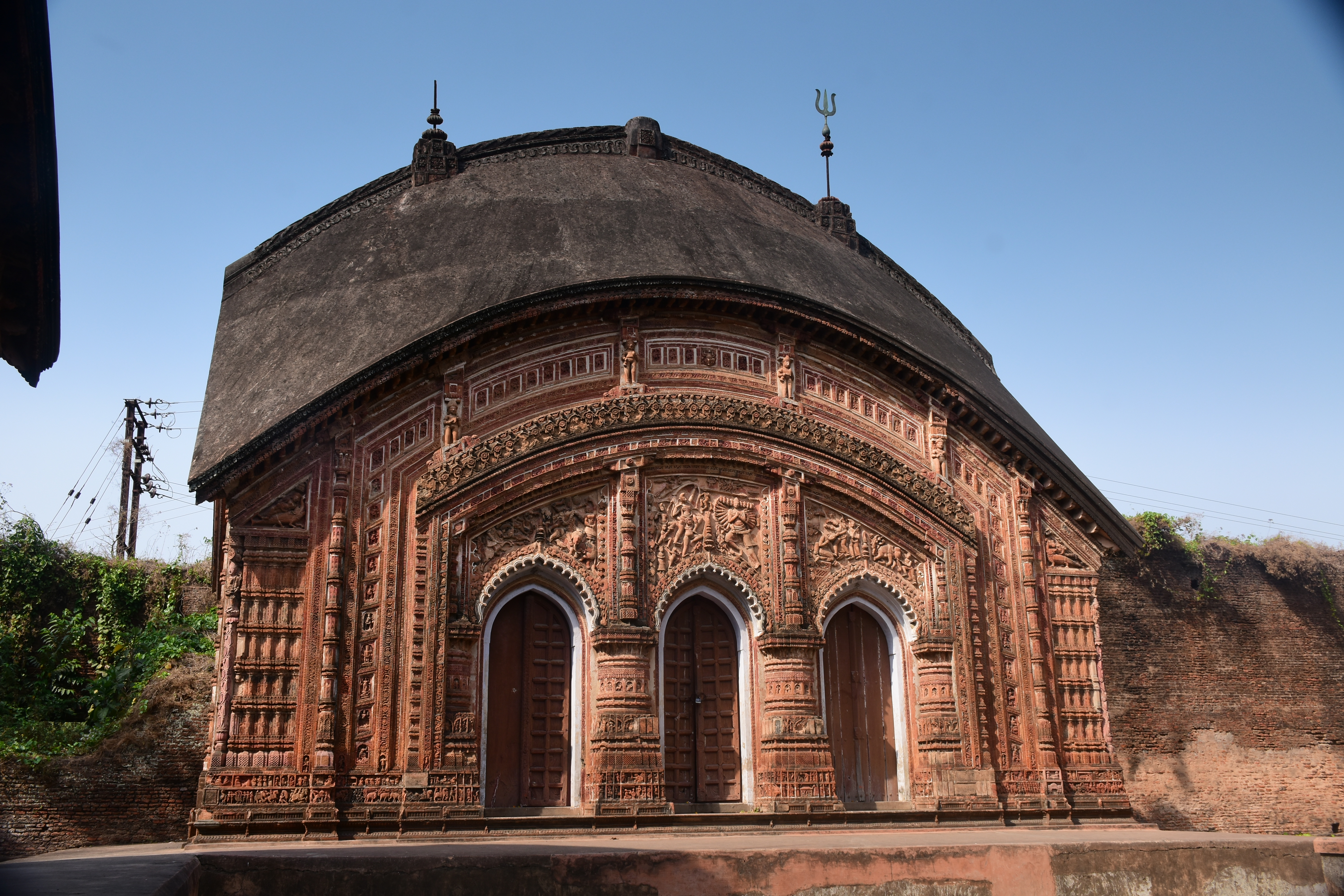
Temple 2

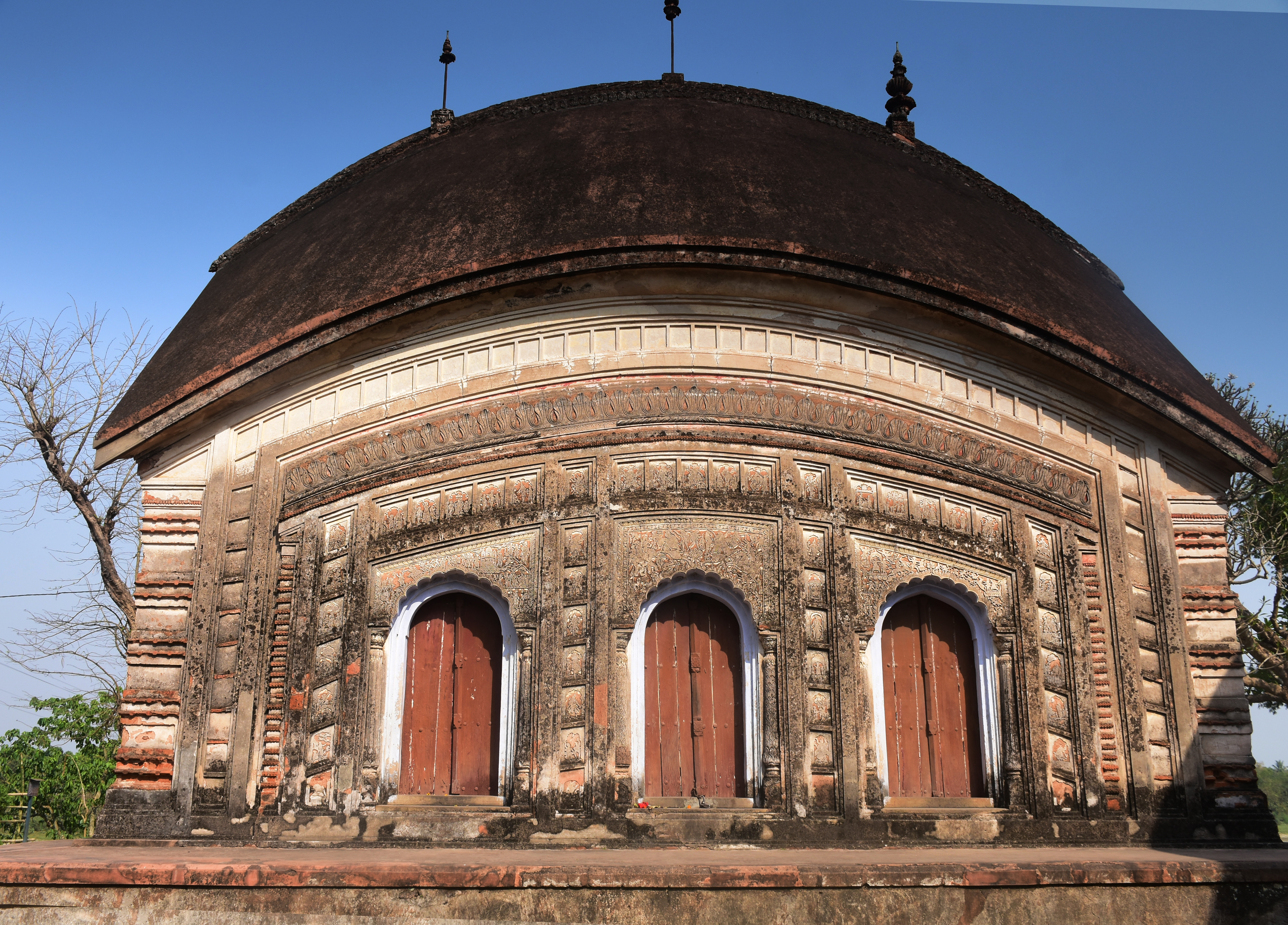
Temple 3

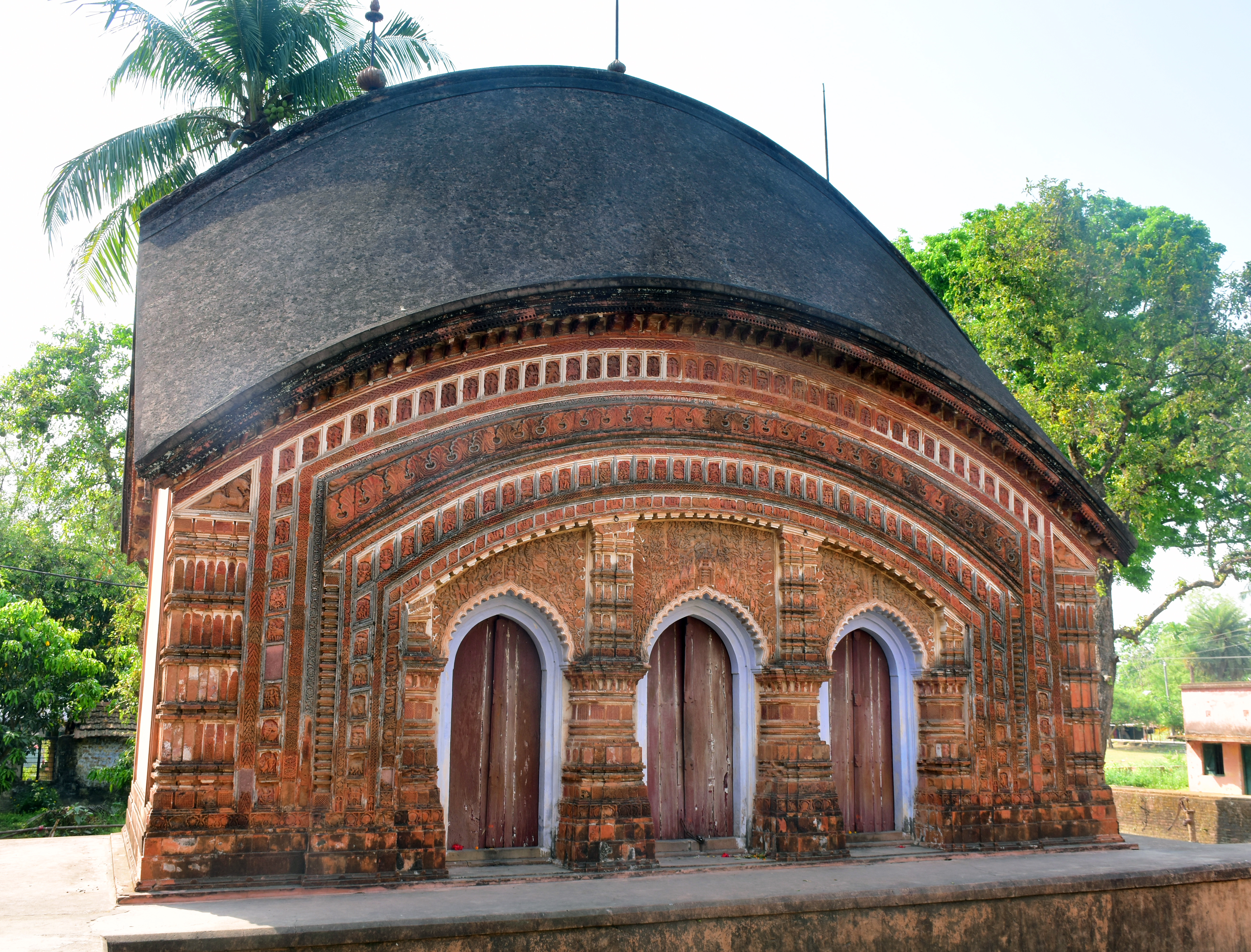
Temple 4

=== Decoration ===
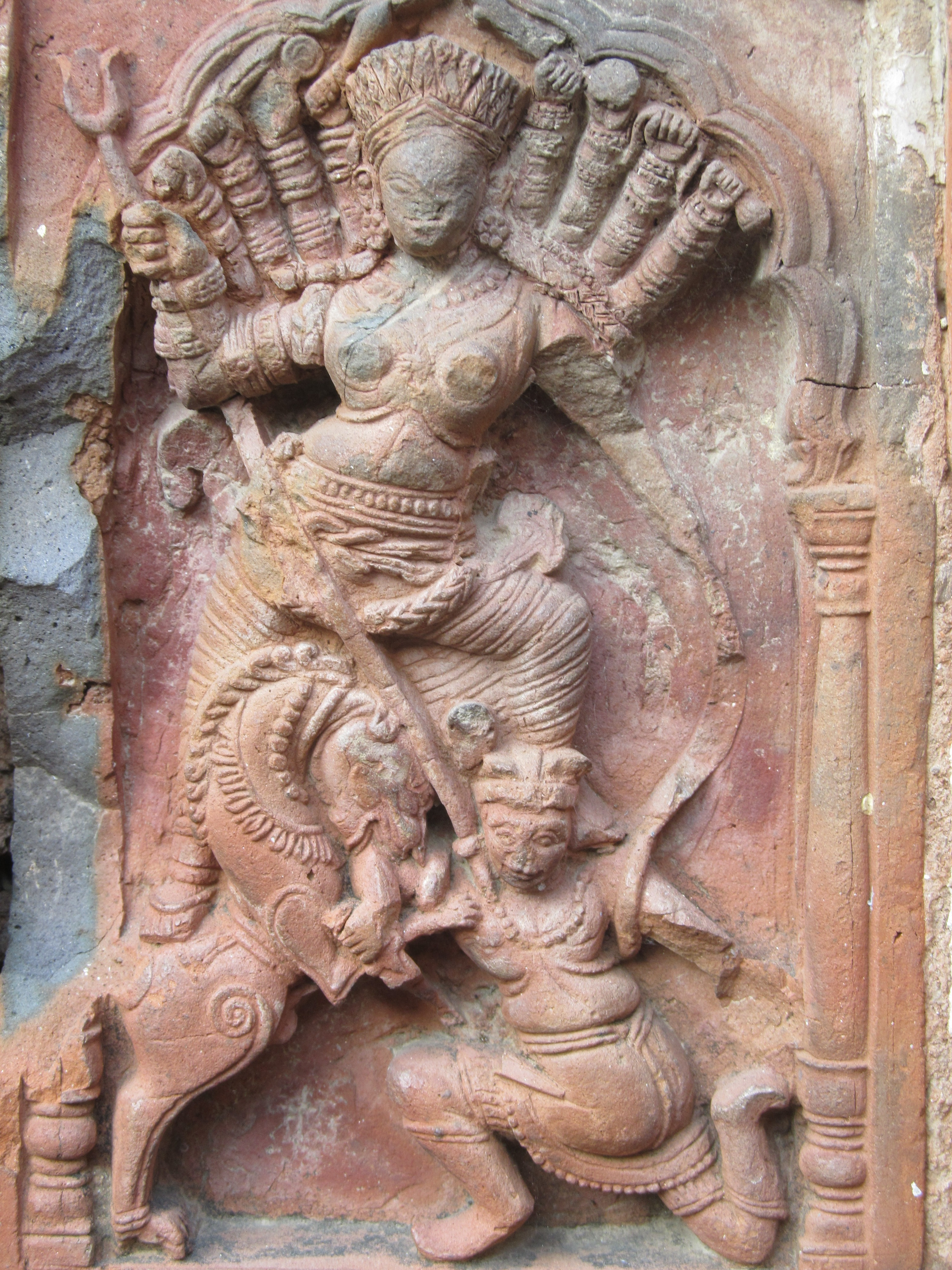

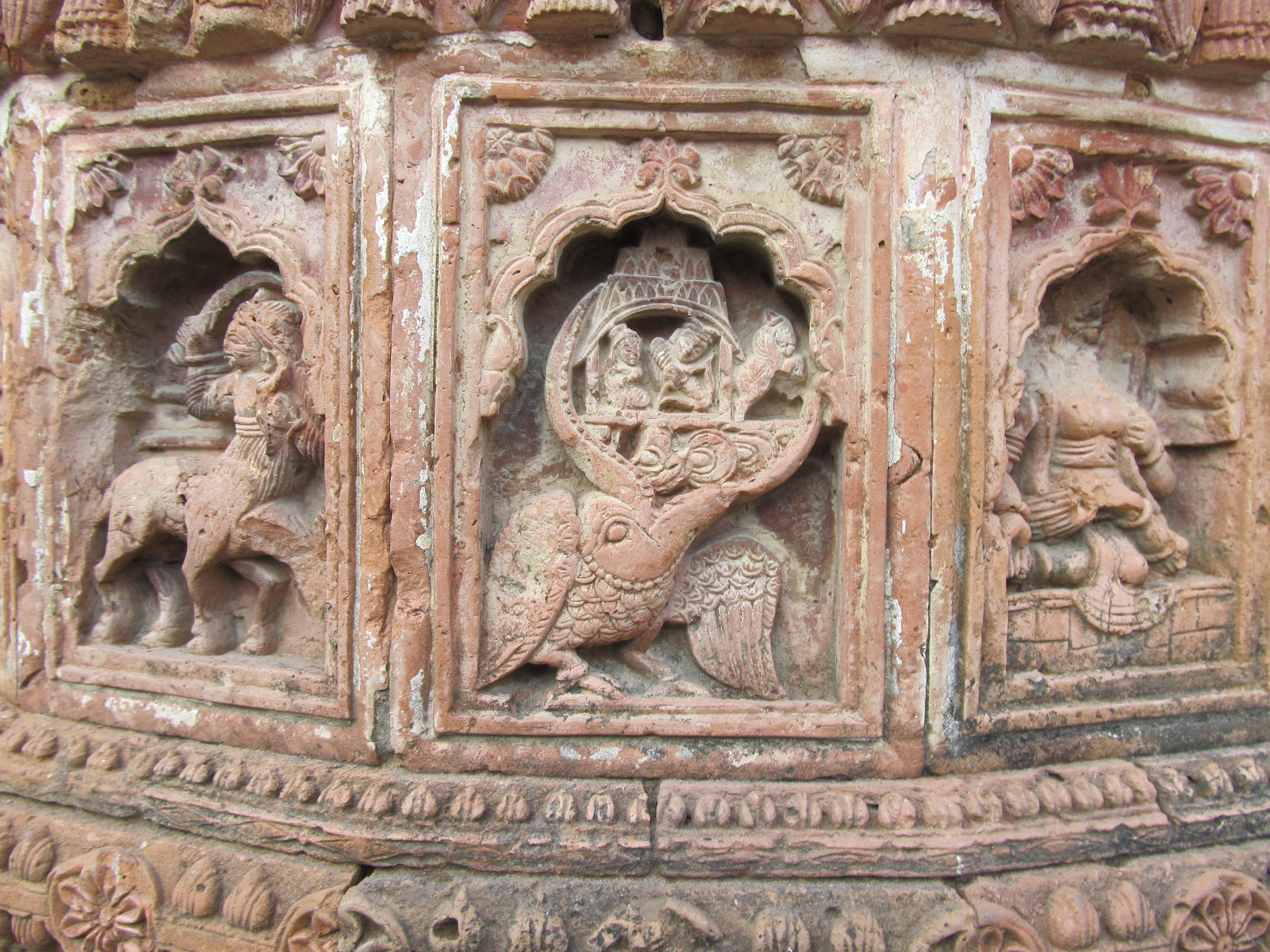

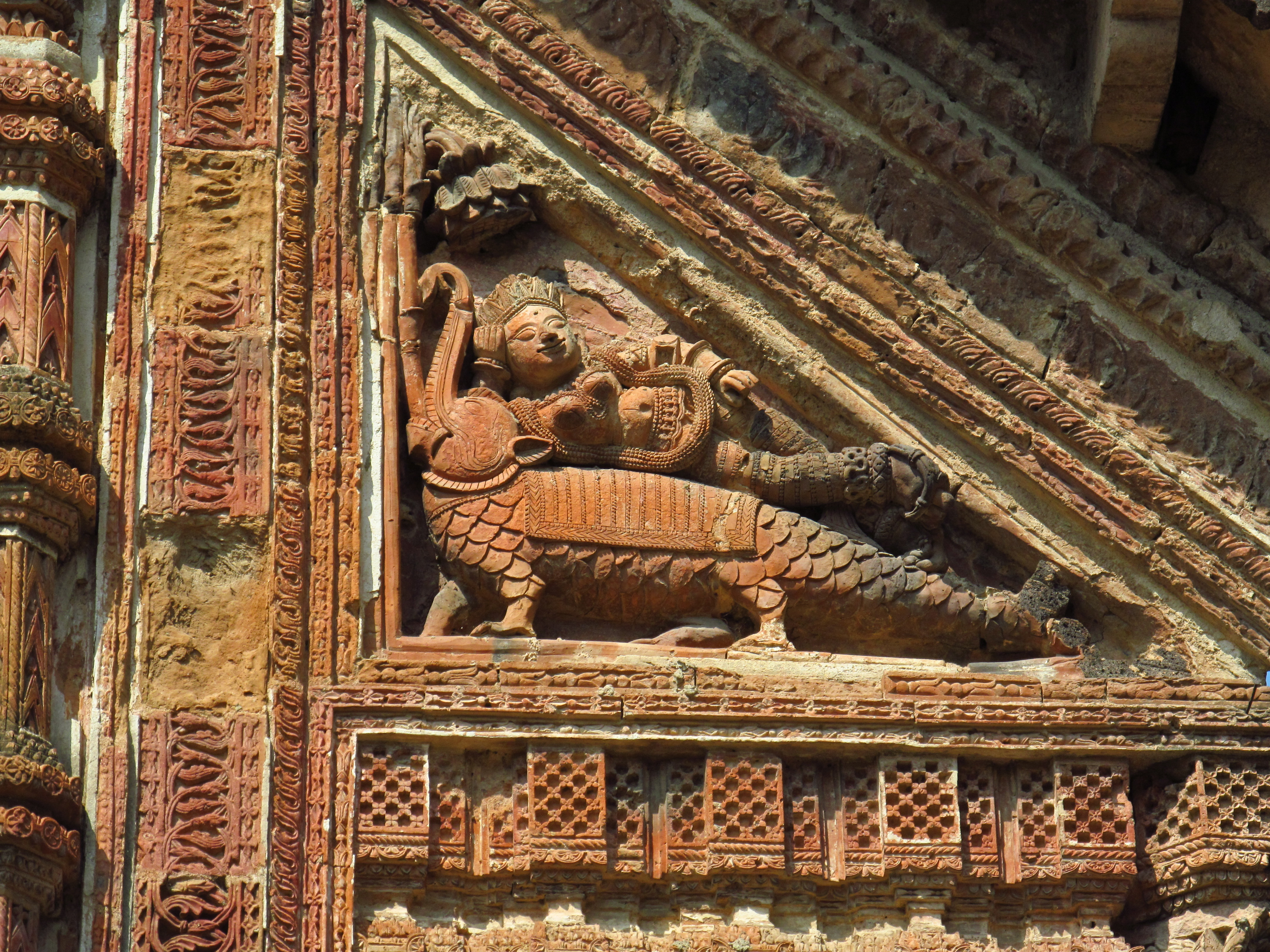

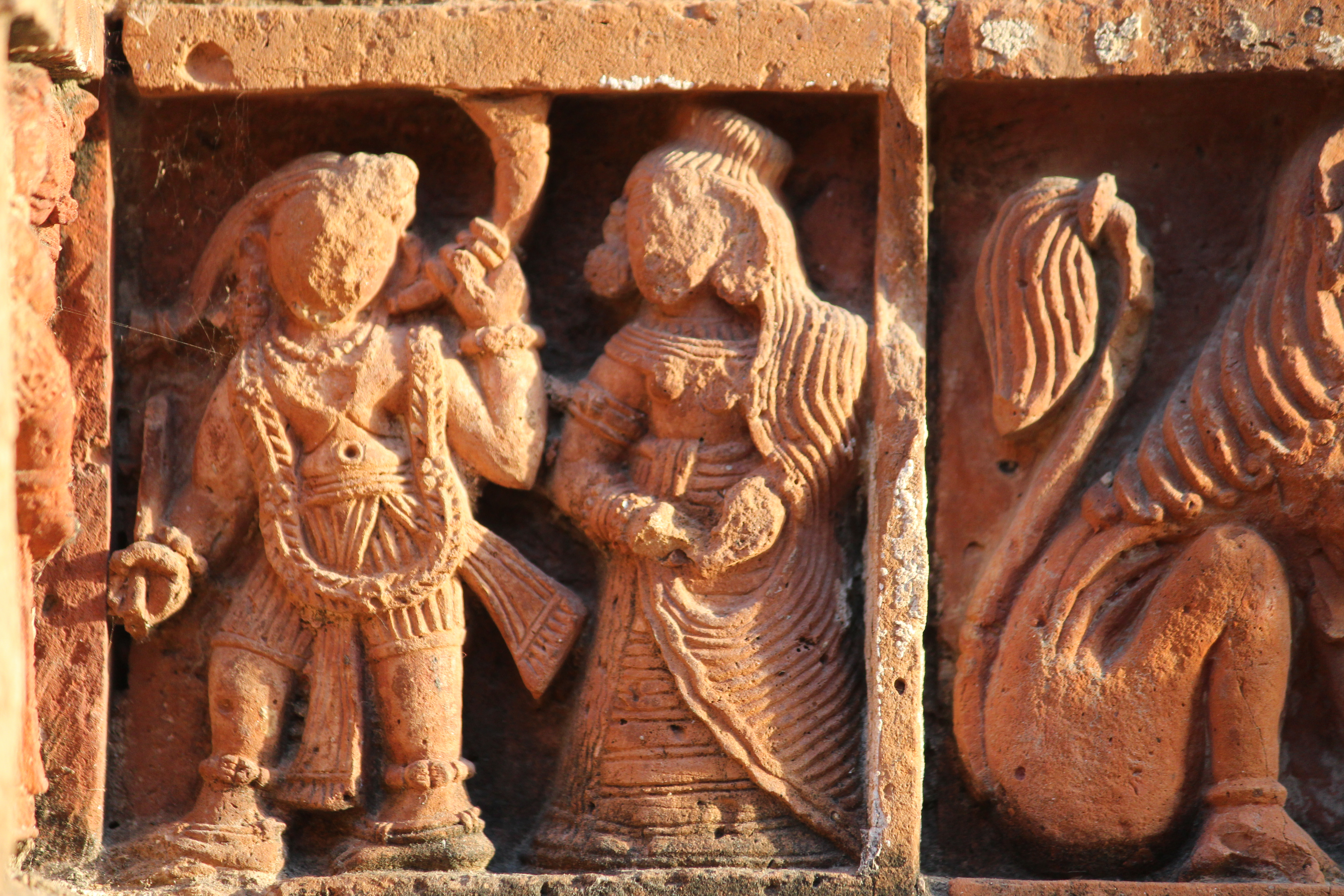

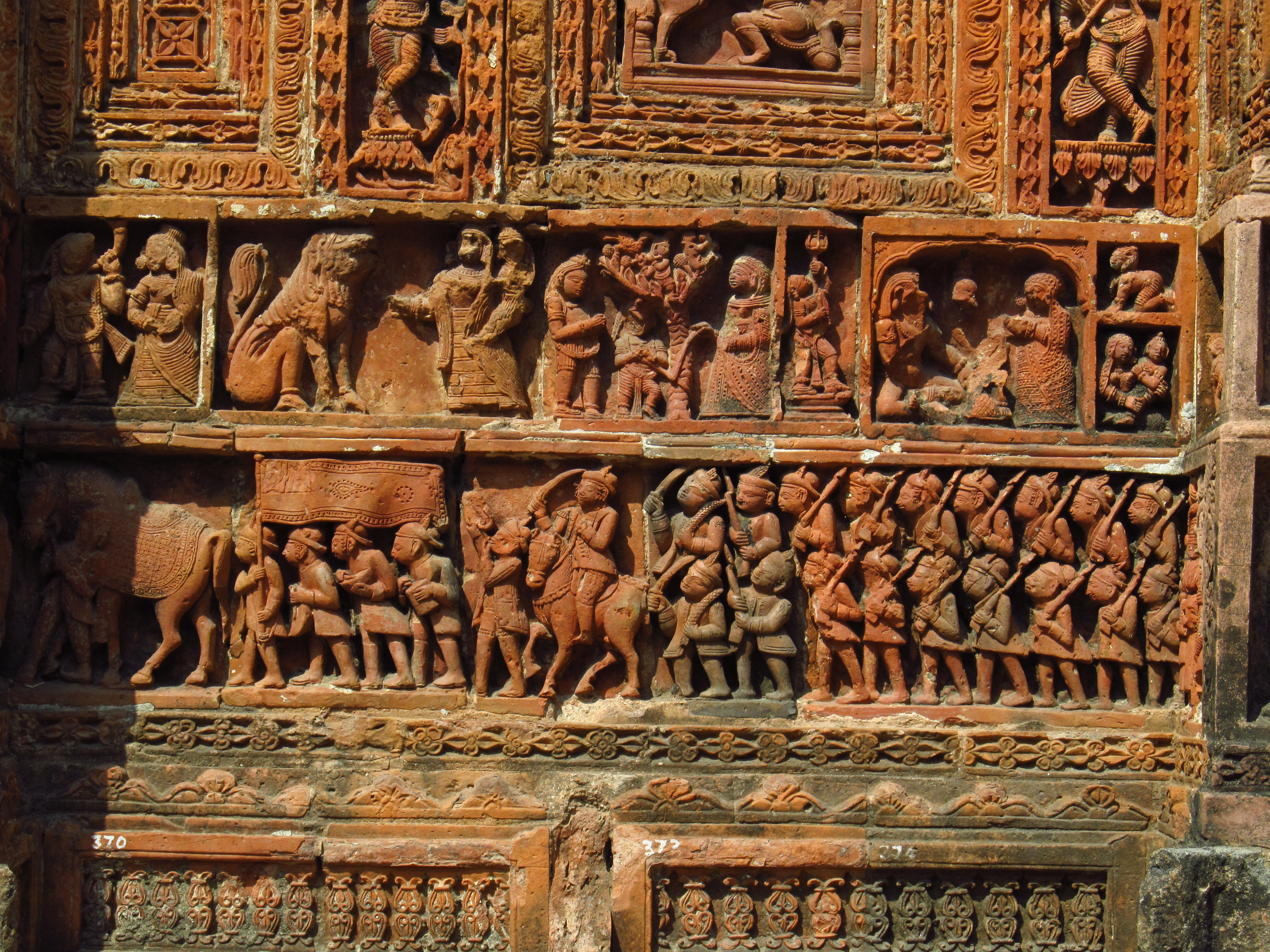

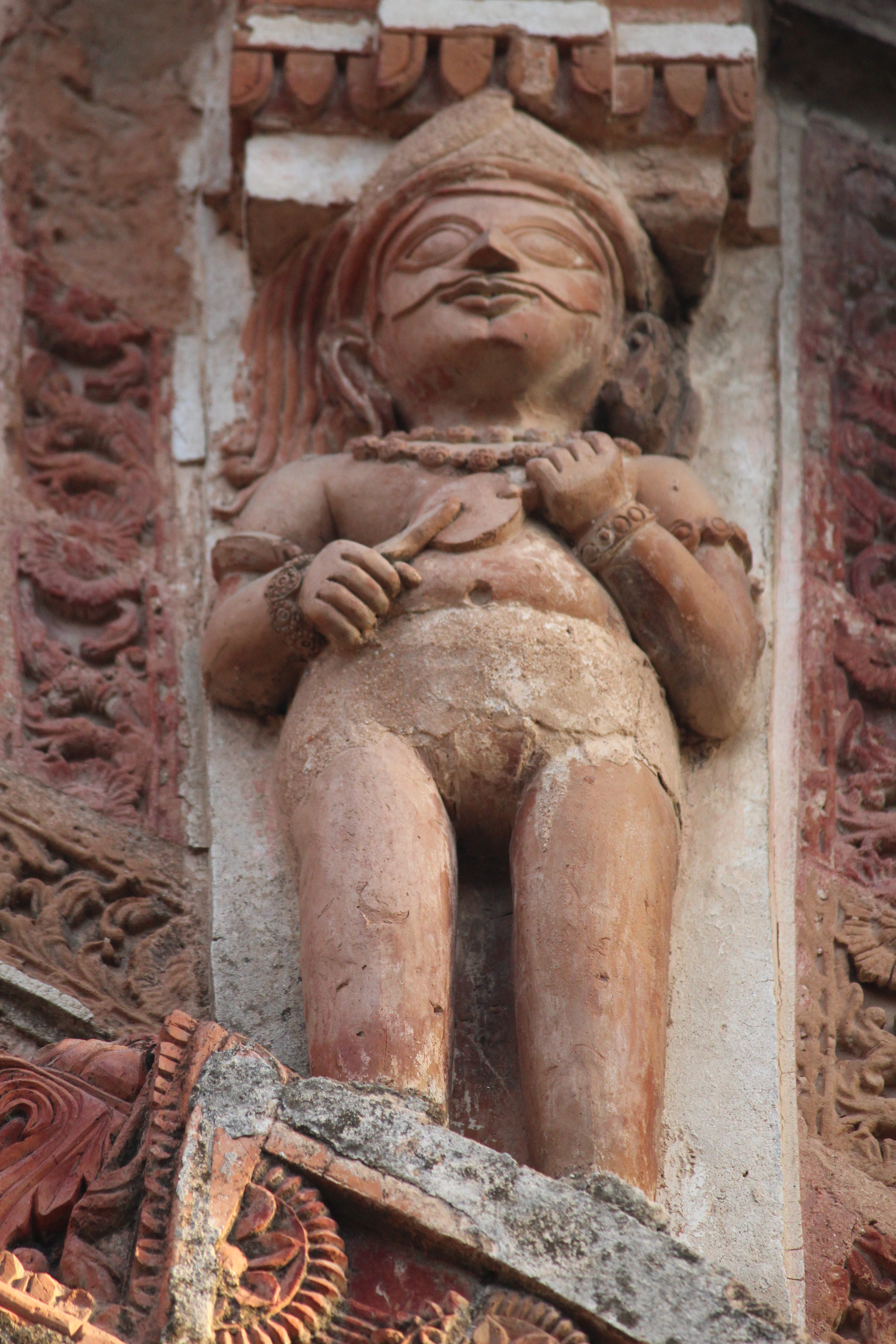
