= Ekdala Wars =

War between Bengal Sultanate and Dehli

First Ekdala War
Date	1353–1359
Location	Ekdala, Bengal
Result	Bengal Sultanate victory: Withdrawal by the Delhi Sultanate; Delhi recognises sovereignty of the Sultan of Bengal

Belligerents
Bengal Sultanate	Delhi Sultanate

Commanders and leaders
Shamsuddin Ilyas Shah; Sikandar Shah	Firuz Shah Tughluq; Malik Dīlān Mīrshikār; Malik Ḥusām ad-Dīn Nawā; Tātār Khān

Strength
200,000 infantry 10,000 horses 51 elephants	260,000 infantry 30,000 horses Elephants

Casualties and losses
180,000 people	Heavy

The Ekdala War (Bengali: একডালার যুদ্ধ, romanized: Ekḍalar Juddhô) was a 14th-century conflict between the Bengal Sultanate and the Delhi Sultanate that took place in the islets of Ekdala in Bengal. The war resulted in Delhi eventually recognising the independence of the Bengal Sultanate.

== Background ==
Iltutmish declared Bengal as a province of Delhi in 1225. The Delhi Sultans attempted to govern Bengal through appointed governors, however, Delhi could not succeed given the considerable overland distance with Bengal. Ambitious governors rebelled and ruled as independent rulers. In 1325, Bengal was reconquered by Delhi sultan Ghiyath al-Din Tughluq and divided into three administrative regions, with Sonargaon ruling eastern Bengal; Gauda ruling northern Bengal; and Satgaon ruling southern Bengal. Even this arrangement broke down. By 1338, the three administrative regions had separatist Sultans, including Fakhruddin Mubarak Shah in Sonargaon; Alauddin Ali Shah in Gauda, and Shamsuddin Ilyas Shah in Satgaon. Afterwards, Ilyas Shah unified the delta of Ganges, Brahmaputra and Meghna Rivers into the Sultanate of Bengal.

== Location ==
The conflict centered on the mud fort of Ekdala. The fort was located on an island surrounded by a moat and marshy jungle. The exact location of the area is unclear; with various sources saying it may have been in Dinajpur, Dhaka, or Pandua.

== First Ekdala War ==
In 1353, the Sultan of Delhi, Firuz Shah Tughluq, led 70,000 of his men into Bengal. They rested at the banks of the Kosi River, which was difficult to cross, and they could also see some of Ilyas Shah's forces posted on the other side near the Ganges Junction. When news of this reached Ilyas Shah, he deserted his capital at Pandua and took shelter in the Fort of Ekdala. The Delhi army then besieged the fort, but was deterred by its island's location and the Bengal navy. According to erstwhile Delhi accounts, the two forces engaged in a battle after the Delhi Sultan tricked Ilyas Shah into attacking Delhi forces, who had pretended to withdraw. The Delhi army occupied Lakhnauti and issued a proclamation asking locals to pledge allegiance to Delhi. With the Bengal army scattered across, Ilyas Shah had fled with seven horsemen as three of his elephants were killed and 48 captured. According to erstwhile Delhi accounts, Firuz Shah Tughlaq's forces were victorious but did not annex the territory upon the wish of their sultan, who had learned from historic incidents with rebellious governors. The Sultan of Delhi also renamed Ekdala to Azadpur (akin to Freetown) and Pandua to Firozabad (after himself). After the forces had set off for Delhi following the victory, Ilyas Shah entered Ekdala and executed the governor put in charge. Other sources claim that the conflict was settled after Bengal agreed to pay an annual tribute to Delhi, and that the exchange of gifts between Delhi and Bengal indicated each other's sovereignty.

== Siege of Ekdala (1359) ==
Firuz Shah Tughluq again invaded Bengal in 1359 when Ilyas Shah's successor, Sikandar Shah, took the throne. Tughluq felt Sikandar Shah had violated the terms of the treaty reached with his father. Tughluq sought to place the son-in-law of one of Ilyas Shah's rivals as the sultan of Bengal. During the invasion, Sikandar Shah based himself in Ekdala fort like his father.

The Delhi army besieged the island fort for months. After growing exhausted of Bengal's climate, the Delhi Sultan reached a peace treaty with Sikandar Shah. Delhi recognized Sikandar as an independent ruler. The peace treaty ensured Bengal's independence for two centuries.

== Sources ==
- Elliot, Henry Miers (1953). Tarikh-i Firoz Shahi Of Shams-i Siraj Afif. Gupta, Susil.
- Sengupta, Nitish K. (2011). Land of Two Rivers: A History of Bengal from the Mahabharata to Mujib. Penguin Books India. ISBN 978-0-14-341678-4.
- Chakrabarti, Kunal; Chakrabarti, Shubhra (2013). Historical Dictionary of the Bengalis. Scarecrow Press. ISBN 978-0-8108-8024-5.
