= Mubarak Shahi dynasty =

Rulers of Sonargaon from 1338 to 1352

Mubārak Shāhī মোবারক শাহী বংশ
- Royal house
- Country: Sonargaon Sultanate
- Current region: Bengal
- Etymology: Name of Fakhruddin Mubarak Shah
- Origin: Noakhali, Bengal
- Founded: 1338
- Founder: Fakhruddin Mubarak Shah
- Final ruler: Ikhtiyaruddin Ghazi Shah
- Titles: Sultan
- Connected members: Bahram Khan - Governor of Sonargaon
- Traditions: Islam
- Estate: Sonargaon
- Dissolution: 1352

The Mubarak Shahi Dynasty (Bengali: মোবারক শাহী বংশ) was a short lived but highly influential dynasty that emerged out of Bengal and gained independence from the Delhi Sultanate. It was the ruling dynasty of the Sonargaon Sultanate. Fakhruddin Mubarak Shah, was the founder and longest ruler of the Sonargaon Sultanate. The dynasty originated from Noakhali, Bangladesh and it eventually met its end with the unification of Bengal under the Bengal Sultanate and Shamsuddin Ilyas Shah's conquest of Sonargaon.

== Origin ==
According to some historians, Mubarak was born into a Bengali Muslim family in a village located in the eastern part of Noakhali, in present day Bangladesh. Although the exact location of this village is uncertain, it is thought to be situated in the Kabirhat Upazila, most likely in that upazila's Chaprashirhat Union. Muhammad Abdur Rahim described Fakhruddin as "a great Bengali warrior and military organiser".

== Fakhruddin Mubarak Shah ==
Fakhruddin Mubarak Shah reigned from 1338–1349, and was also known simply as Fakhra. He was a Bengali Muslim ruler and the founder of the first independent Bengali sultanate, which comprised modern-day eastern and southeastern Bangladesh. His kingdom revolved around the city of Sonargaon. It was during this time in which the city emerged as a chief superpower during his reign. Mubarak Shah was also the first Muslim ruler to conqueror Chittagong, the principal port of Bengal in 1340 CE. Ibn Batuta, after visiting his capital in 1346, described Shah as "a distinguished sovereign who loved strangers, particularly the fakirs and sufis". The Iqlim (administrative division) of Mubarakabad is said to have been named after him.

=== Independence from Delhi ===
After the death of Bahram Khan in 737 AH (1336-1337 AD), Mubarak rose to power and declared himself as independent ruler from his proclaimed capital in Sonargaon. After hearing of Mubarak's revolt against Delhi, the Governor of Lakhnauti Qadar Khan sent a large army to suppress him.

Mubarak fled from the battlefield, and his assets were captured by Qadar Khan's forces and Sonargaon was seized. However, Mubarak managed to execute Qadar Khan and regain Sonargaon by luring Qadar Khan's army who had fallen into dissension regarding the sharing of the spoils. He then appointed his servant Mukhlis to administer Lakhnauti but Mukhlis was defeated by Qadar Khan's ariz (war minister) Alauddin Ali Shah.

=== Conquests ===
Shah's conquests of Comilla and Noakhali (present-day Bangladesh) were followed by gains of northern Sylhet and southern Chittagong. His military enterprise included a successful naval action against Sultan Alauddin Ali Shah of the Lakhnauti Sultanate. Shah sponsored several construction projects, including a trunk road and raised embankments, along with mosques and tombs.

== Ikhtiyaruddin Ghazi Shah ==
Ikhtiyaruddin Ghazi Shah, was most probably Fakhruddin's son according to historian Jadunath Sarkar and succeeded him and ruled the independent Sultanate from Sonargaon till 1352. He was the second and final ruler of Sonargaon and during his reign in 1350, he lost Chittagong to the king of Arakan.

In 1352 Ilyas Shah, independent Sultan of Satgaon, who already captured the Lakhnauti Sultanate, attacked Sonargaon. In the battle Ikhtiyaruddin was defeated and killed. Thus for the first time in history, Bengal was unified, comprising Sonargaon, Satgaon and Lakhnauti.

== List of Rulers ==
| Titular Name(s) | Personal Name | Reign |
|---|---|---|
| Sultan Fakhruddin Mubarak Shah Bengali: ফখরুদ্দীন মুবারক শাহ | Fakhra Bengali: ফখরুদ্দীন মুবারক শাহ | 1338-1349 |
| Sultan Ikhtiyaruddin Ghazi Shah Bengali: ইখতিয়ারউদ্দিন গাজী শাহ | Ikhtiyaruddin Ghazi Shah Bengali: ইখতিয়ারউদ্দিন গাজী শাহ | 1349–1352 |

| Preceded by Delhi Sultanate | Sultanate of Sonargaon; 1338-1342 | Succeeded by Bengal Sultanate |

== See also ==
- Bengal Sultanate
- Shamsuddin Ilyas Shah
- History of Bangladesh
- List of Sunni Muslim dynasties
