= Ikhtiyaruddin Ghazi Shah =

Sultan of Sonargaon from 1349 to 1352

Ikhtiyaruddin Ghazi Shah (Bengali: ইখতিয়ারউদ্দিন গাজী শাহ, Persian: اختیار الدین غازی شاه; reigned 1349–1352) was an independent sultan of Sonargaon.

== History ==
Ikhtiyaruddin was the son and successor of Fakhruddin Mubarak Shah. He was the second and final ruler of the Mubarak Shahi Dynasty. He also issued his own coins struck in his own name.

== Death ==
In 1352 Ilyas Shah, independent Sultan of Satgaon, who already captured the Lakhnauti Sultanate, attacked Sonargaon. In the battle Ikhtiyaruddin was defeated and killed. Thus for the first time in history, Bengal was unified comprising Sonargaon, Satgaon and Lakhnauti.

== See also ==
- List of rulers of Bengal
- Sonargaon
- Mubarak Shahi Dynasty

Regnal titles
Preceded by Fakhruddin Mubarak Shah	Independent Sultan of Sonargaon; 1349–1352	Succeeded by Ilyas Shah; Independent Sultan of Bengal
