= Goaldi Mosque =

Mosque in Sonargaon, Bangladesh

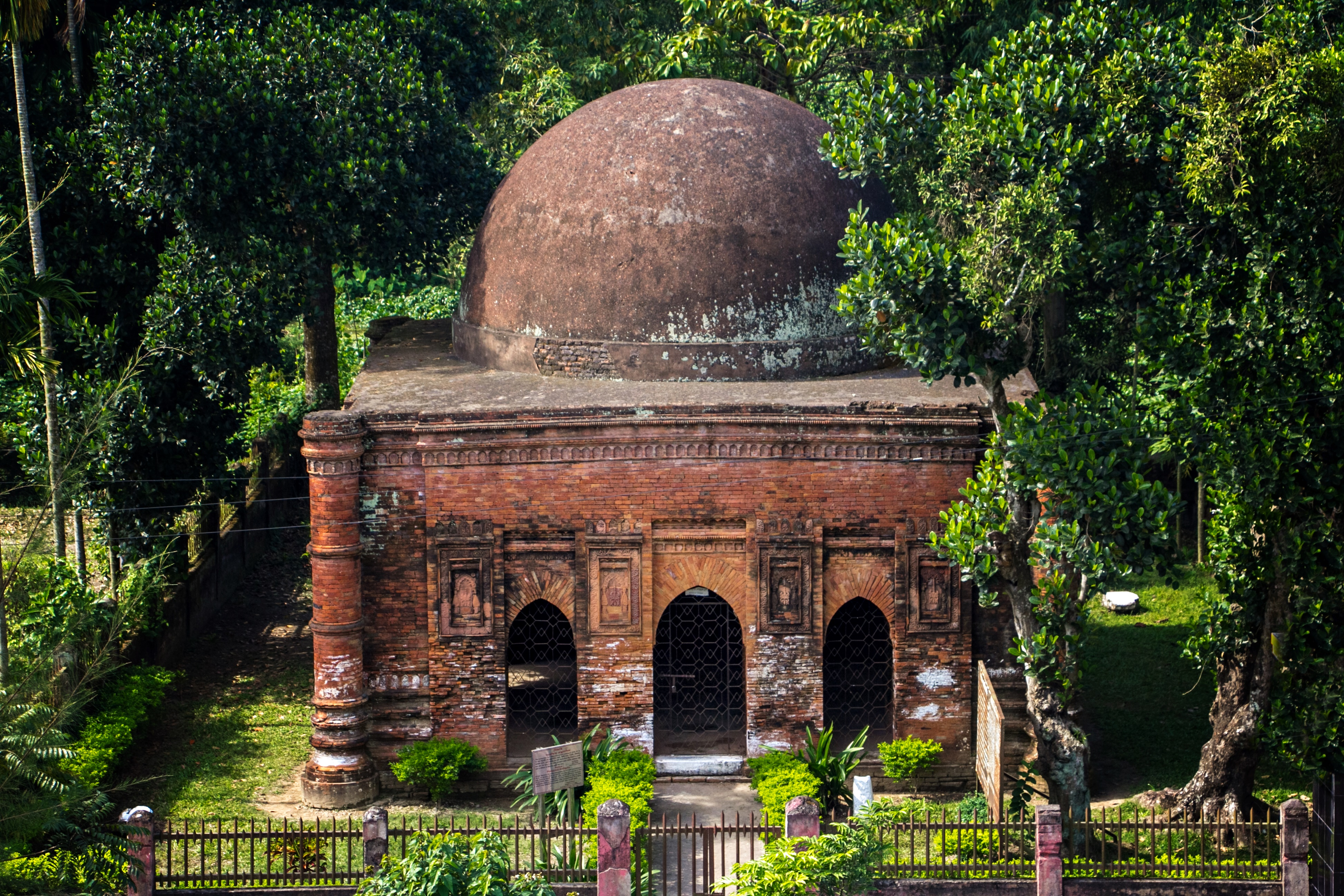

- Location of the mosque in Bangladesh

Religion
- Affiliation: Islam
- Ecclesiastical or organisational status: Mosque
- Status: Active

Location
- Location: Sonargaon, Narayanganj, Dhaka Division
- Country: Bangladesh
- Coordinates: 23°23′32″N 90°21′13″E

Architecture
- Style: Bengal Sultanate
- Founder: Mulla Hizabar Akbar Khan
- Completed: 1519; 507 years ago

Specifications
- Interior area: 4.9 m^{2} (53 ft^{2})
- Dome: One
- Inscriptions: One
- Materials: Brick, Dark Basalt, Sandstone

The Goaldi Mosque (Bengali: গোয়ালদি মসজিদ) is a mosque in the historic Bengali capital of Sonargaon, in Narayanganj District, in the Dhaka Division of Bangladesh. The Sultanate period mosque was built during the reign of Sultan Alauddin Hussain Shah in 925 A.H./1519 AD. It is one of the few surviving medieval monuments in Sonargaon Upazila.

== History ==
The mosque was established in 1519 by Mulla Hizabar Akbar Khan during the reign of Sultan Alauddin Husain Shah of Bengal at a place called Goaldi - half a mile northeast of Panam city in Sonargaon. Sonargaon was a Mint Town of the Bengal Sultanate and often served as a royal capital. The Sultans often launched raids into Assam, Tripura and Arakan from Sonargaon. The town was the principal administrative center of eastern Bengal, particularly the Bhati region. The area falls under present-day Narayanganj District. The mosque is one of the more elegant and ornate sultanate-era mosques in the country. Prior to the 1975 restoration by Bangladesh's Directorate of Archaeology, the dome and most of the south, east, and north walls had collapsed, with only the western qibla wall remaining intact.

== Architectural features ==
The Goaldi Mosque features a square prayer hall with internal dimensions of 4.93 by 4.97 m (16.2 by 16.3 ft) meters, enclosed by a surrounding wall 1.65 to 2.29 meters thick. (Note: According to Abu Sayeed M Ahmed: 4.90 m square internally with a 1.65 m wide surrounding wall. According to Perween Hasan: The interior is 4.93 m x 4.97 m; the wall thickness is 2.29 m) It is an example of the 'enclosed square type' mosque of Bengal that is distinguished by a cubical prayer chamber with corner towers and entrances on all sides except the qibla wall. A single dome caps the mosque; engaged ribbed turrets define the four corners; and the cornice is gently sloped. Circular corner towers are a deviation from the usual octagonal corner towers. This is the only example of circular corner towers in the Dhaka district. Accentuating the cornice is a row of small niches with floral motifs inside.

Goaldi Mosque plan

The east facade has three arched openings, embellished on either side with rectangular panels of delicate relief work in the form of a niche with an ornamental hanging lamp motif. The north and south facades similarly display three arches, though only the center arch is open while the two side arches are blind.

The dome is carried on squinches that spring from the tops of stone pilasters, two on each wall. The qibla wall has three mihrabs. It is decorated with beautiful, intricate patterns composed of an ornamental hanging lamp motif. The two flanking mihrabs are decorated in similar fashion but instead of black basalt they are made of brick and fine terracotta work.

== Inscription ==
The mosque inscription dates the mosque's erection to 15 Shaban 925 AH or 12 August 1519 in Georgian calendar. Inscription in Perso-Arabic reads:

“The Almighty Allah says, ‘And the places of worship are for Allah [alone]: so invoke not anyone along with Allah’ [Quran 72:18]. Allah is the best knower of the right [things]. The Prophet, may peace and blessings of Allah be upon him, says, ‘He who builds a mosque in this world, Allah will build for him seventy palaces in Paradise’ [Hadith]. This mosque was built during the reign of the Sultan of Sultans, Sultan Husain Shah, son of Ashraf al-Husaini, may his kingdom and authority be perpetuated. This mosque was built by Mulla Hizbar Akbar Khan, on the 15 th of the month of Shaban, in the year 925 [12 August 1519]”

== Present condition ==
The condition of the mosque had deteriorated: with the exception of the qibla wall the entire mosque had collapsed, including the dome. Careful restoration was executed by the Department of Archaeology and Museums and this small graceful mosque is now restored to resemble its original design.

== See also ==
- Islam in Bangladesh
- List of mosques in Bangladesh

== Bibliography ==
- Michell, George, ed. (1984). The Islamic Heritage of Bengal. Unesco. ISBN 978-92-3-102174-9.
- Hasan, Perween (2007). Sultans and Mosques: The Early Muslim Architecture of Bangladesh. Bloomsbury Academic. ISBN 978-1-84511-381-0.
- Ahmed, Abu Sayeed M. (2006). Mosque Architecture in Bangladesh. UNESCO Dhaka. ISBN 978-984-32-3469-8.
