= Neel Kuthi =

Neel Kuthi was built by the English East India Company, sometime at the beginning of the indigo trade and management. It is a two-storied structure located north of Panam in Sonargaon, Bangladesh across the Mughal Bridge on Dulalpur road. The structure is located at distance from the nearby population.

== Feature ==
The structure has a combination of Mughal and local decorative features. The building has a courtyard, which was used for packaging and processing Indigo powder and the surrounding rooms were used for storage. The building in the front was used as an office, while the back building was composed of blank wall surfaces. The main entrance is located on the road and another entrance is in the middle of the north wall. Next to the side entry lie the stairs to the upper floor. The upper floor includes a mezzanine for storage purposes.
