= Shamsuddin Ilyas Shah =

Sultan of Bengal from 1352 to 1358

- Shāh-i-Bangāliyān; Abu al-Muẓaffar Ilyās Shāh

1st Sultan of Bengal
- Reign: 1352–1358
- Predecessor: Alauddin Ali Shah; Ikhtiyaruddin Ghazi Shah
- Successor: Sikandar Shah

Ruler of Satgaon
- Reign: 1342–1352
- Predecessor: Izzuddin Yahya
- Successor: Position abolished (himself as Sultan of Bengal)
- Born: Sistan
- Burial: Hajipur, Bihar
- Spouse: Phulmati Begum
- Issue: Shahzada Sikandar
- House: Ilyas Shahi dynasty
- Religion: Sunni Islam

Shamsuddin Ilyas Shah (Persian: شمس الدین الیاس شاه, Bengali: শামসুদ্দীন ইলিয়াস শাহ) was the founder of the Bengal Sultanate and Ilyas Shahi dynasty. The Ilyas Shahi Dynasty ruled Bengal for 145 years.

== Life and family ==
Ilyas Shah was a follower of Sunni Islam. There are conflicting views on whether he was born in Sistan or not, although it is agreed that his origins definitely lay in the Sistan region of what is today eastern Iran and southern Afghanistan. According to Syed A M R Haque, it was his predecessors who had first arrived to the subcontinent, as Muslim missionaries, and the family were granted jagirs by the Delhi Sultanate in Bengal in 1227. Ilyas was a Sunni Muslim by faith.

Ilyas Shah rose through the Delhi Sultanate's ranks and was appointed governor of Satgaon. In the early 14th-century, the Delhi Sultanate divided Bengal into three provinces based in the towns of Satgaon in South Bengal, Sonargaon in East Bengal, and Lakhnauti in North Bengal. After being appointed governor of Satgaon, defeated Alauddin Ali Shah of Lakhnauti and Ikhtiyaruddin Ghazi Shah of Sonargaon to unify Bengal as an independent sultanate.

According to a narrative by Durgachandra Sanyal, Ilyas was on his way to Sonargaon when he married a Bengali Brahmin widow from Bajrayogini, Bikrampur that had embraced Islam and taken the name Phulmati Begum, and they later had two sons and several daughters including Sikandar Shah. Sanyal adds that the marriage was initially protested by upper-class Brahmins due to the fact that widow remarriage was impermissible in Hinduism. Nevertheless, Ilyas proceeded with the nikah as he could not allow the girl to live as an outcast in her society or fall into harlotry. This narrative is supported by Dinesh Chandra Sen. Citing Nalini Kanta Bhattasali, Abdul Karim also mentions that Ilyas married a Hindu woman according to tradition, without mentioning her name as Fulmati.

== Military campaigns ==
Ilyas Shah maintained an army of 90,000 cavalry and many elephants. In 1346, As the ruler of Satgaon, Ilyas Shah led the very first Muslim army into Nepal. He first occupied the Tirhut region, which he divided into two parts. The part north of the Budhi Gandaki River were restored to Raja Kameshwar Thakur of the Oiniwar dynasty, while Ilyas kept the southern part for himself, stretching from Begusarai to Nepal Terai. Its headquarters was situated in the village of Ukkacala (later known as Hajipur in his honour), where Ilyas had constructed a large fort and urbanised the area. Ilyas then thrust through the Terai plains with his army, into the Kathmandu Valley ruled by Jayaraja Deva. His army sacked the temple of Swayambhunath and looted Kathmandu city for three days, returning to Bengal with plentiful spoils. None of the existing buildings in Kathmandu valley predates the raid. However, the temple of Changu Narayan was never sacked as the Islamic forces could never locate the temple.

Ilyas Shah then invaded Orissa, which was ruled by Bhanudeva II of the Eastern Ganga dynasty. He further sacked Jajpur, Cuttack and reached as far as the Chilika Lake. The Jagannath Temple was also desecrated during the invasion. He also led a successful campaign against the Kamarupa kingdom in present-day Assam, being the first Muslim king to capture Guwahati. Ilyas Shah also founded the city of Hajipur and first settled in 1350 AD.

In November 1353, the Delhi Sultan Firuz Shah Tughluq launched an invasion of Bengal. His army occupied Pandua. Ilyas Shah and his forces retreated to the fortress of Ekdala. The Delhi Sultan laid siege to the fortress for two months. The Delhi Sultanate's forces then began withdrawing. Ilyas Shah began to pursue the Delhi army and reached as far as Varanasi. The Delhi army formidably fought back. Firuz Shah returned to Delhi in 1355. Ilyas Shah regained control of Bengal and his realm extended up to the Koshi River.

The extent of Ilyas Shah's campaigns, including his conquest of major Indian cultural centers, was considered "world-conquering" in the context of medieval India. This led to him being styled as "the second Alexander" in the same manner as Alauddin Khalji.

== Administration ==
The Bengal Sultanate under Ilyas Shah was an absolute monarchy, and took influence from Persianate traditions.

=== Unification of Bengal ===
Ilyas worked under the service of the Delhi Sultanate, though it is not confirmed if he was positioned in Bengal from the start. Some have claimed that Ilyas was originally based in Delhi and moved to Bengal after problems arose, while others claim that his family had migrated to Bengal long before.

According to Banglapedia, Ilyas was initially working under Malik Firuz in Delhi. Nevertheless, Ilyas eventually served under Izzuddin Yahya, the imperial provincial governor of Satgaon in present-day South Bengal.

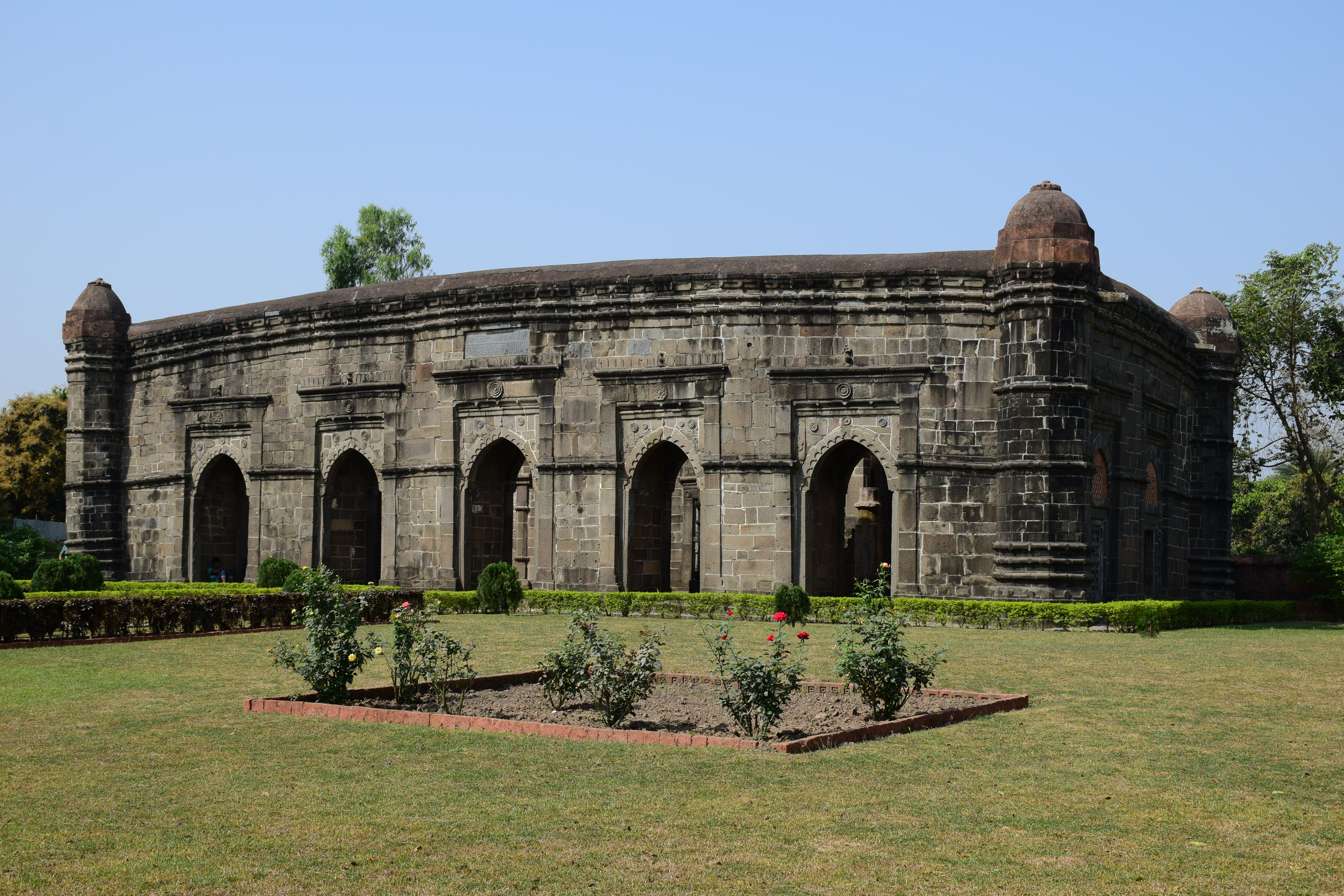
A former mosque in Pandua, where Ilyas Shah established the capital of Bengal

Following Yahya's death in 1338, Ilyas declared himself as the independent Sultan of Satgaon, with the title of Shams ad-Din. He then waged a long war from 1339 to 1352 against Sultan Alauddin Ali Shah of Lakhnauti (North Bengal) and Sultan Ikhtiyaruddin Ghazi Shah of Sonargaon (East Bengal). Ilyas Shah emerged victorious after conquering Lakhnauti and Sonargaon in 1342 and 1352 respectively. He then proclaimed the establishment of the Sultanate of Bengal in 1352 through the unification of these regions, moving his capital to Pandua, not far from Lakhnauti in northern Bengal. The area was the former capital of the Gaur kings and Pala emperors.

Bengal Delta territory was known as "Vanga" was renamed as "Bangālah" or "Mulk-i-Bangālah". He was known as "Shāh-i-Bangāliyān" or "Shāh-i-Bangālah" during his tenure.

Shams-i Siraj 'Afif author of Tarikh-i-Firoz Shahi referred to Shams al-Din Ilyas Shah as the "sultan of the Bengalis" and the "king of Bengal.

Coins bearing attributes were inscribed by the Shamsuddin Ilyas Shah and Sikandar Shah:

The just sultan, Shams al-dunya va al-din, Abu'I Muzaffar, Ilyas Shah, the Sultan. The second Alexander, the right hand of the caliphate, the defender (or helper) of the Commander of the Faithful.

=== Government ===
Ilyas Shah displayed an egalitarian attitude towards his subjects; his administration was known for its equality and acceptance of members from different religious, caste, social, and ethnic communities. He standardised the people of Bengal under the banner of one politico-social and linguistic platform, including the Bengali language. The region received immigrants from across the Muslim world, including North Indians, Turks, Abyssinians, Arabs and Persians.

Although he was born in Safarid Sistan in Iran, it is debated whether he was a Turk or a Persian, given that he replaced Bangla with Persian as his court language. Under the Bengal sultanate Persian became the language of art, culture, education and literature in Bengal. After his ascent, bengal remained under foreign control until the twentieth century, including Turkic, Afghan, Iranian and British rulers, except for a brief interregnum by Raja Ganesha in 1415.

He maintained good relations with Firuz Shah Tughluq (r. 1351–1388), towards the end of his reign. He sent elephants to the Delhi court and received Turkish and Arabian horses in return.

== Death ==
Ilyas Shah died on January 1358, and was buried in Hajipur.

== Legacy ==
In honour of his efforts in fortifying and urbanising Ukkacala, the city was renamed to Hajipur. During the reign of Mughal emperor Akbar, the Governor of Bihar Said Khan's brother Makhsus Shah constructed a congregational mosque within Ilyas Shah's fort in 1587.

Presently, a mazar (mausoleum) on SDO Road is attributed to the former Sultan, and lies adjacent to the Haji Ilyaas Park. The tomb is respected by both Muslims and Hindus, who hold a mela every year during his Urus.

== See also ==
- History of Bengal
- List of rulers of Bengal
- Mubarak Shahi Dynasty

== Furthur reading ==
- Eaton, Richard M. (1993). The Rise of Islam and the Bengal Frontier, 1204-1760. University of California Press. ISBN 978-0-520-20507-9.
- Bhattacharya, Sabyasachi (2020). A Comprehensive History of Modern Bengal, 1700-1950. Asiatic Society. ISBN 978-93-89901-95-5.
