= Noakhali =

Noakhali may refer to:

- Noakhali Municipality
- Noakhali language
- Noakhali District, a district of Bangladesh
- Noakhali riots
- Noakhali Sadar Upazila
