= Alauddin Ali Shah =

Sultan of Lakhnauti from 1338 to 1342

Sultan of Lakhnauti
- Reign: 1338–1342
- Predecessor: Qadar Khan
- Successor: Shamsuddin Ilyas Shah
- Born: Ali Mubarak
- Died: 1342; Bengal Sultanate
- Religion: Islam

Alī Mubārak (Persian: علی مبارک), better known by his regnal title `Alā ad-Dīn `Alī Shāh (Bengali: আলাউদ্দীন আলী শাহ, Persian: علاء الدین علی شاه; r. 1338–1342) was an independent Sultan of Lakhnauti in Bengal. He was the foster brother of Shamsuddin Ilyas Shah, the eventual founder of the Bengal Sultanate.

== History ==
Ali was born into a noble Muslim family belonging to the Turco-Persian tradition that had expanded into South Asia. He worked under Malik Firuz in the city of Delhi in North India. Later being ousted from Delhi, Ali moved to Bengal where he worked as the Ariz-i-Mumalik (army administrator) of Qadar Khan, the Governor of Lakhnauti. After Khan's death, Ali killed the deputy-governor and ascended to the power of Lakhnauti in 1339 by taking the opportunity of Sultan Muhammad bin Tughluq's involvement in other areas of his Sultanate. Around the same time, in 1338, Fakhruddin Mubarak Shah of Sonargaon and Shamsuddin Ilyas Shah of Satgaon, the founder of the Ilyas Shahi dynasty, who is sometimes referred to as Alauddin's foster brother, became independent as well, and thus began a tripartite power struggle in Bengal. Ibn Battuta described the struggle between him and Fakhruddin Shah as a bitter one. During his rule of nearly three years, he transferred his capital from Lakhnauti to Hazrat Pandua.

In 1342, he was defeated and killed in a battle against Shamsuddin Ilyas Shah.
