= Fakhruddin Mubarak Shah =

Sultan of Sonargaon from 1338 to 1349

Sultan of Sonargaon
- Reign: 1338–1349
- Predecessor: Governor Bahram Khan (under Delhi Sultanate)
- Successor: Sultan Ikhtiyaruddin Ghazi Shah
- Died: 1349; Sonargaon Sultanate
- Burial: 1349
- Issue: Ikhtiyaruddin Ghazi Shah
- House: Mubarak Shahi Dynasty
- Religion: Islam

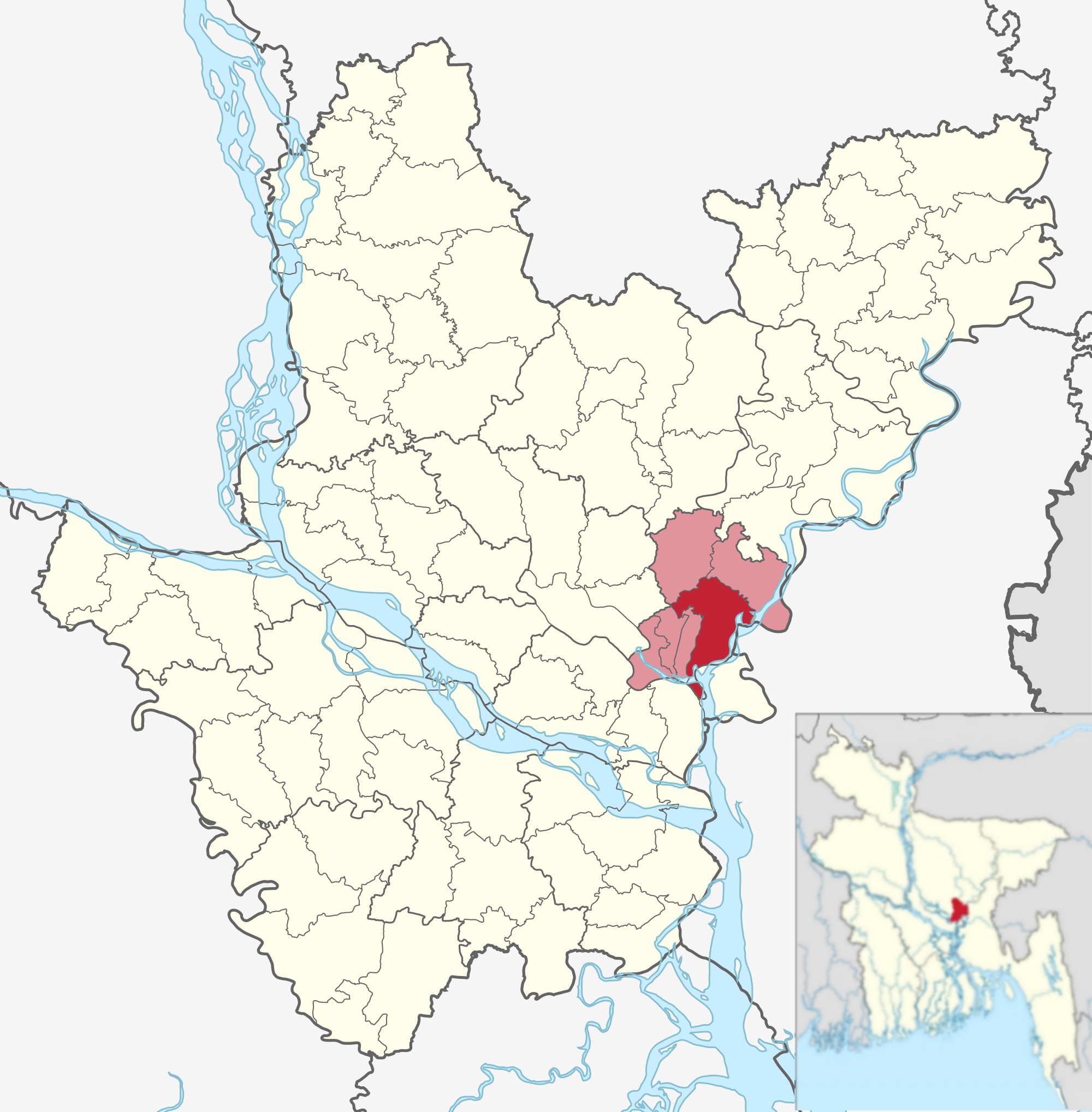
Sonargaon area

Fakhruddin Mubarak Shah (Bengali: ফখরুদ্দীন মুবারক শাহ, Persian: فخر الدین مبارک شاه; reigned: 1338–1349), also known simply as Fakhra, was a Bengali Muslim ruler and the founder of an independent sultanate and the Mubarak Shahi Dynasty, covering modern-day eastern and southeastern Bangladesh. Muhammad Abdur Rahim described Fakhruddin as "a great Bengali warrior and military organiser". His kingdom was centred in the city of Sonargaon, which emerged as a major regional power during his reign. He was also the first Muslim ruler to conquer Chittagong, the principal port of the Bengal region, in 1340 AD.

== Early life ==
According to some historians, Mubarak was born into a Bengali Muslim family in a village located in the eastern part of Noakhali, in present-day Bangladesh. Although the exact location of this village is uncertain, it is thought to be situated in the Kabirhat Upazila, most likely in that upazila's Chaprashirhat Union. Muhammad Abdur Rahim described Fakhruddin as "a great Bengali warrior and military organiser".

Mubarak found employment as a silahdar (chief armour-bearer) under Bahram Khan, the governor of Sonargaon appointed by Delhi's sultan, Muhammad bin Tughluq.

== Reign ==
After the death of Bahram Khan in 737 AH (1336–1337 AD), Mubarak rose to power and declared himself an independent ruler, establishing his capital in Sonargaon. After hearing of Mubarak's revolt against Delhi, the Governor of Lakhnauti, Qadar Khan, sent a large army to suppress him. Mubarak fled the battlefield, his assets were captured by Qadar Khan's forces, and Sonargaon was seized. However, Mubarak managed to execute Qadar Khan and regain Sonargaon by luring Qadar Khan's army, which had fallen into dissension regarding the sharing of the spoils. He then appointed his servant Mukhlis to administer Lakhnauti, but Mukhlis was defeated by Qadar Khan's ariz (war minister), Alauddin Ali Shah.

Mubarak's conquests of Comilla and Noakhali were followed by territorial gains to the north in Sylhet and to the south in Chittagong. His military initiatives included a successful naval action against Sultan Alauddin Ali Shah of Lakhnauti. Shah sponsored several construction projects, including a trunk road and raised embankments, along with mosques and tombs. Ibn Battuta, after visiting his capital in 1346, described Shah as "a distinguished sovereign who loved strangers, particularly the fakirs and sufis."

The Iqlim (administrative division) of Mubarakabad is said to have been named after him.

Ikhtiyaruddin Ghazi Shah, who according to historian Jadunath Sarkar was most probably Fakhruddin's son, succeeded him and ruled the independent sultanate from Sonargaon until 1352.

According to Sahidul Hasan, a faculty member at the University of Dhaka, Mubarak's reign started at 734 AH (1333–1334 AD) based on the numismatic evidence in Stan Goron and G. P. Goenka's catalogue on seven new coins of Mubarak.

Regnal titles
Preceded by Governor Bahram Khan	Independent Sultan of Sonargaon; 1338–1349	Succeeded by Sultan Ikhtiyaruddin Ghazi Shah
