= Muslin trade in Bengal =

Textile trade in Eastern India

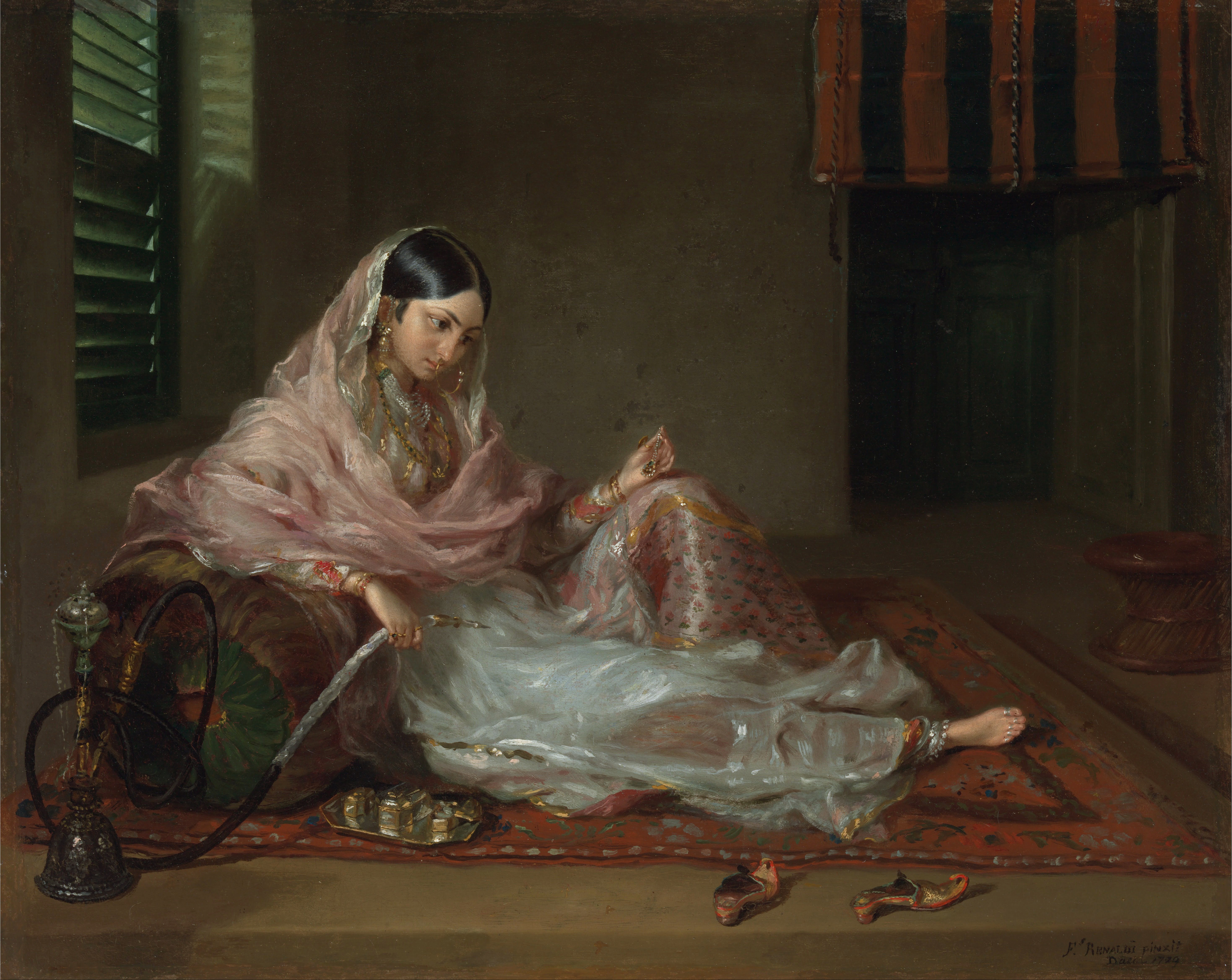
A woman wearing fine Bengali muslin, c. 1789, by Francesco Renaldi.

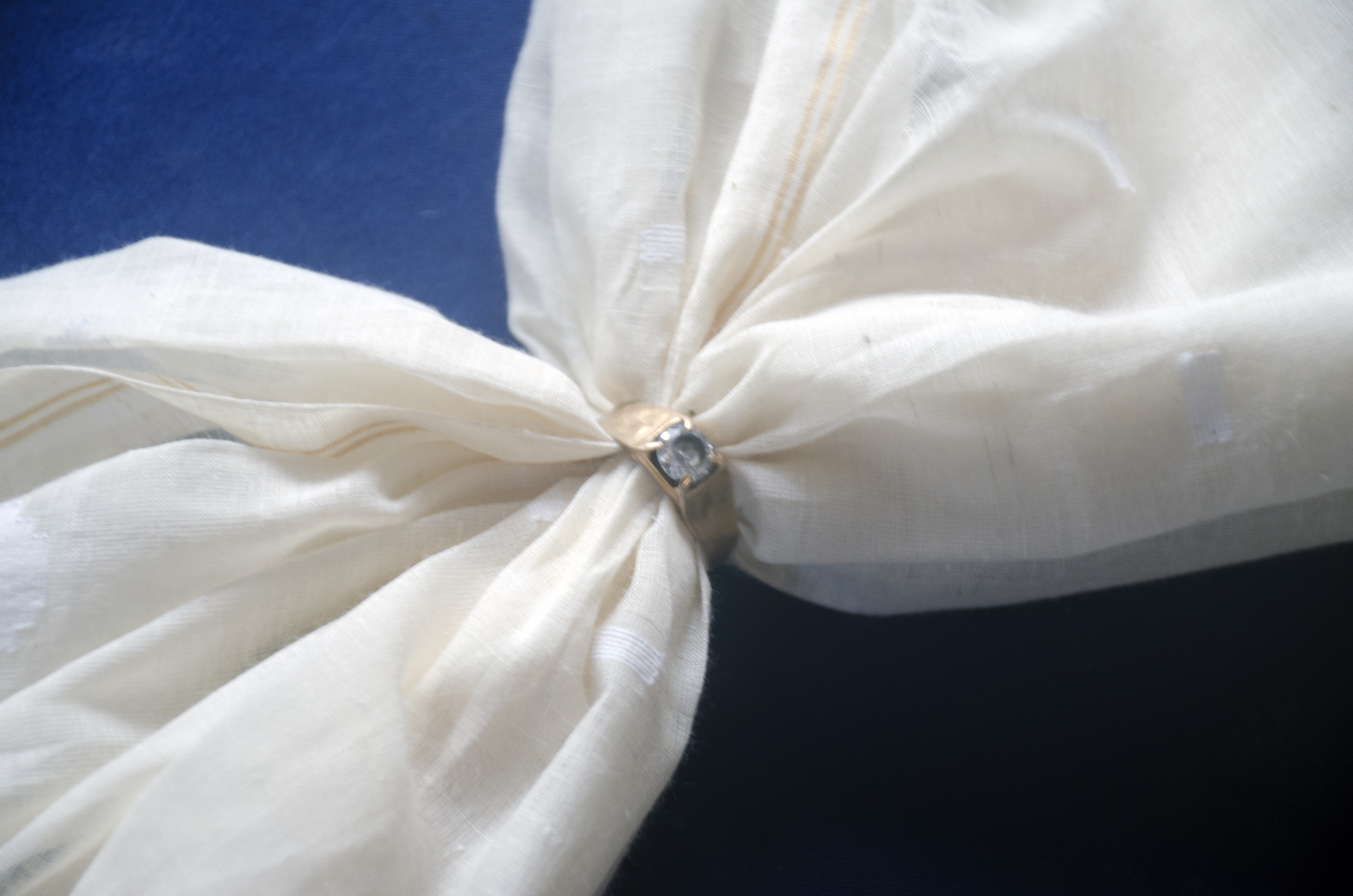
Muslin saree passing through a ring

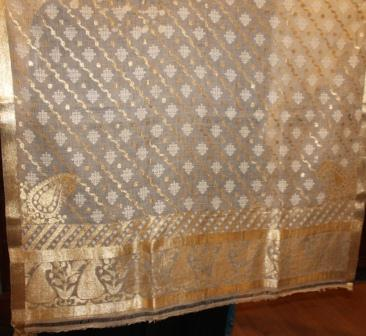
Shawl made of Muslin in the 18th century, woven in Sonargaon, Dhaka.

Muslin, a Phuti carpus cotton fabric of plain weave, was historically hand woven in the areas of Bangladesh (Dhaka, Sonargaon) and West Bengal (Murshidabad,Nadia) and exported for many centuries. The region forms the historic region of Bengal. The muslin trade at one time made the Ganges delta and what is now Bangladesh and West Bengal into one of the most prosperous parts of the world. Of all the unique elements that must come together to manufacture muslin, none is as unique as the cotton, the famous "phuti karpas", scientifically known as Gossypium arboreum var. neglecta. Dhaka muslin was immensely popular and sold across the globe for millennia. Muslin from Murshidabad region of "India" is mentioned in the book Periplus of the Erythraean Sea, authored by an anonymous Egyptian merchant around 2,000 years ago; it was appreciated by the Ancient Greeks and Romans, and the fabled fabric was the pinnacle of European fashion in the 18th and 19th century. Production ceased sometime in the late 19th century, as the Bengali muslin industry could no longer compete against cheaper British-made textiles.

== Origins ==
Bengal has manufactured textiles for many centuries, as recorded in ancient hand-written and printed documents. Muslin finds mention in Megasthenes’ writings, a Greek envoy to the court of Chandragupta Maurya in the 4th century BC, and is supposed to be the fabric worn by the figurines of the 2nd century BC found at Chandraketugarh(now Berachampa, West Bengal). The Periplus of the Erythraean Sea written between 40 and 70 AD mentions Arab and Greek merchants trading between India and the Red Sea port of Aduli (in present-day Eritrea), Egypt and Ethiopia. The Charyapada of the 10th century, written on palm leaves, contain a complete description of the process of weaving muslin. Cloths including muslin were exchanged for ivory, tortoiseshell and rhinoceros-horn at that time. Muslin was traded from Barygaza – an ancient port of India located in Gujarat – to different parts of Indian subcontinent before European merchants came to India.

The Romans prized muslin highly, using bullion and gold coins to buy the material from Deccan and South India. They introduced muslin into Europe, and eventually it became very popular. A Chinese voyager, Ma Huan, wrote about five or six varieties of fine cloths after visiting Bengal in the early fifteenth century; he mentions that Bengal muslin was highly priced in China at that time.

== Mughal era ==
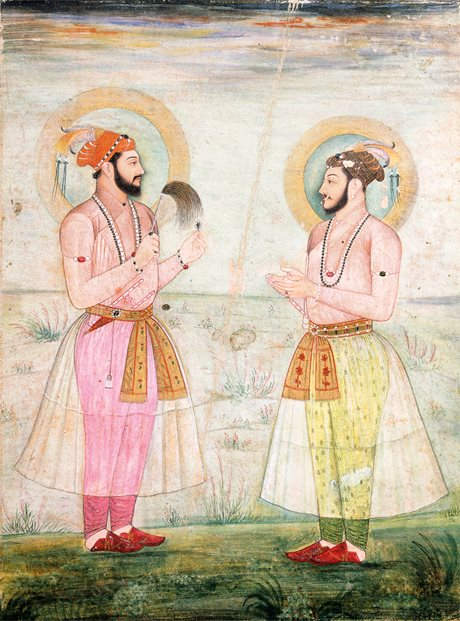
Bengali muslin was associated with the power and elegance of the Mughal court in India, as shown in this 1665 depiction of princes Dara Shikoh and Sulaiman Shikoh Nimbate

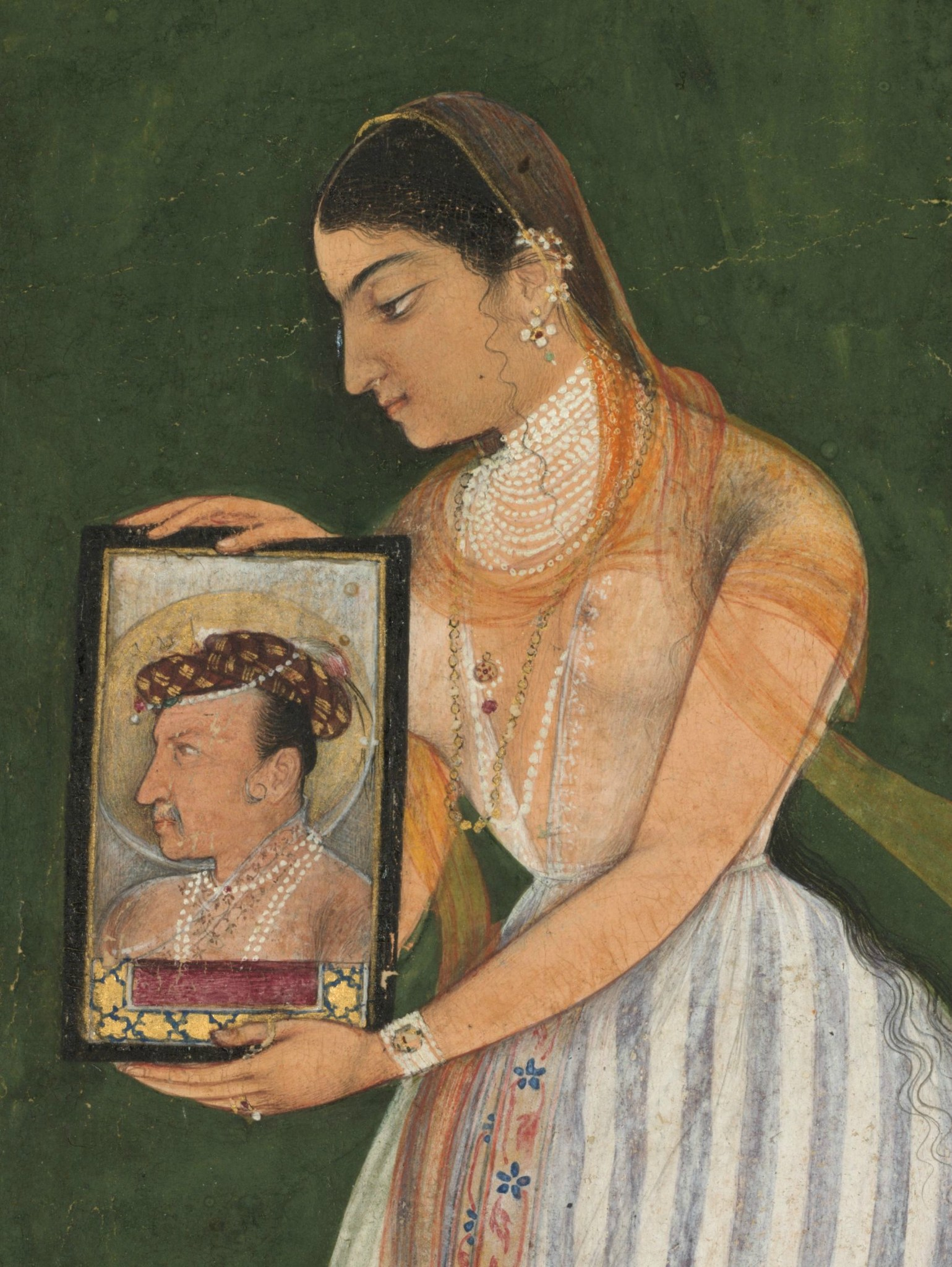
Mughal Empress Nur Jahan holding a portrait of Jahangir by Bishandas in a translucent muslin gown c.1627

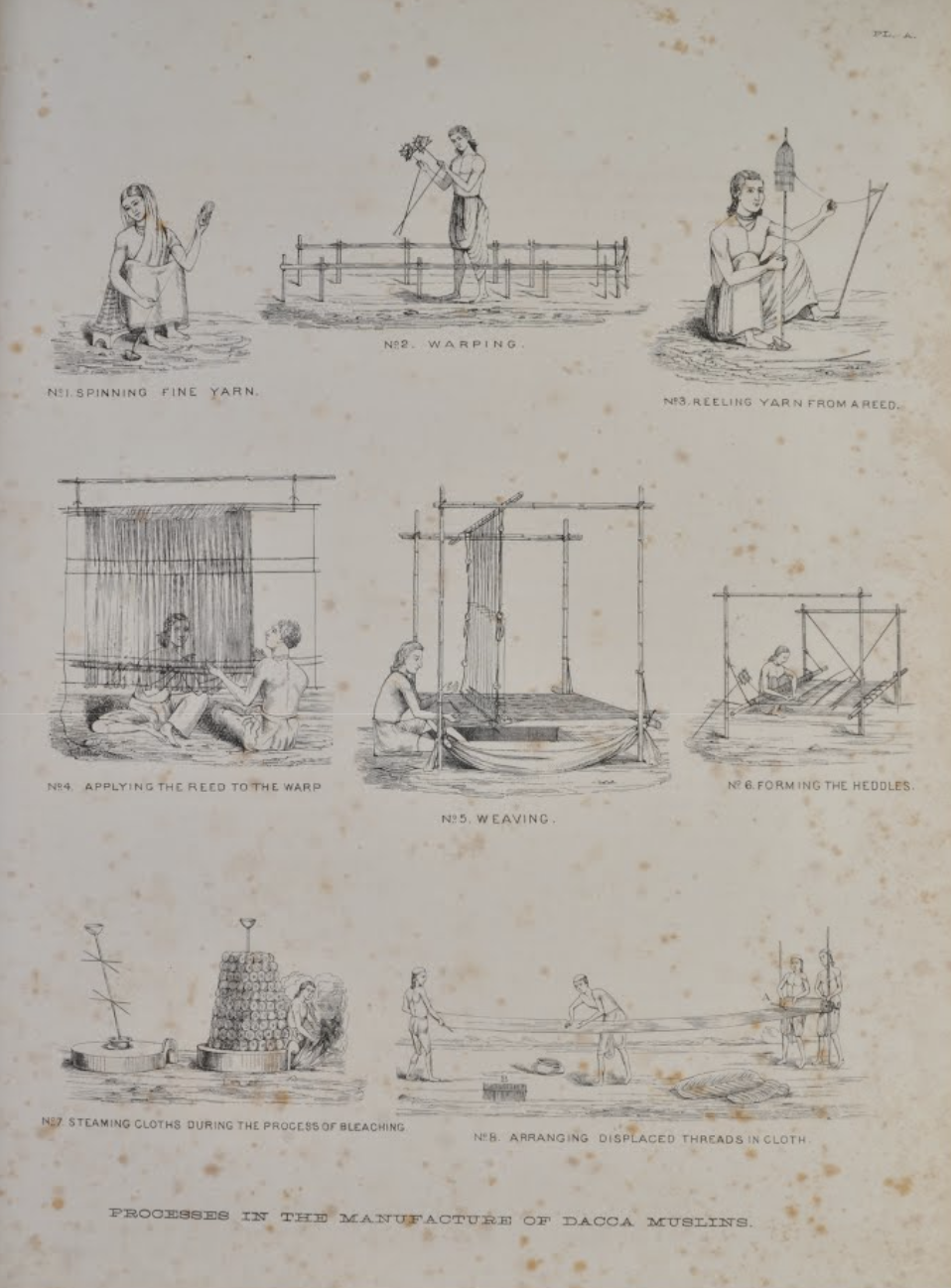
Processes in the Manufacture of Dacca Muslins, in: John Forbes Watson: The Textile Manufactures and the Costumes of the People of India. London, 1866.

Under Mughal rule, Bengal was a center of the worldwide muslin, silk and pearl trades. During the Mughal era, the most important center of cotton production was Bengal, particularly around its capital city of Dhaka, leading to muslin being called "daka" in distant markets such as Central Asia. Bengal also exported cotton and silk textiles to markets such as Indonesia and Japan and after the arrival of the Portuguese in late 15th century, a small amount of Indian textiles started to travel directly to Europe. Bengal produced more than 50% of textiles of Indian subcontinent and around 40% of silks imported by the Dutch from Asia, for example.

=== Sixteenth century ===
In the early sixteenth century, the Portuguese apothecary and diplomat Tomé Pires mentioned in his book Suma Oriental que trata do Mar Roxo até aos Chins (An Account of the East, from the Red Sea to China) that Bengal muslins were traded to Thailand and China. Bengali muslin was also traded throughout the Muslim world, from the Middle East to Southeast Asia. By 1580, some Portuguese traders settled at Dhaka and Sripur, from where they started exporting muslin, cotton and silk goods to Europe and Southeast Asia.

During Ottoman rule from the sixteenth century onwards, large quantities of muslin was exported to the Middle East. Muslin turbans were favoured by the Ottomans. In the sixteenth century, Portuguese started trading textiles from the Indian subcontinent through the Persian Gulf including high quality of muslins. In the seventeenth century, the Portuguese trade declined.

=== Seventeenth century ===
In the early seventeenth century, English and Dutch merchants arrived at the Indian subcontinent sailing via the Red Sea. At the same time, Armenian merchants from Iran came to the Indian subcontinent travelling on land through Qandahar and Isfahan. They traded textile goods including muslin from Bengal to Aleppo of Syria. In an official inventory of Istanbul market dated from 1640, 20 types of muslins were found and the highest value found there is 1600 silver pence. As the business expanded, European companies became interested in founding their own factories in Dhaka. The Dutch made their factory in Dhaka in 1663, the English in 1669 and the French in 1682.

=== Eighteenth century ===
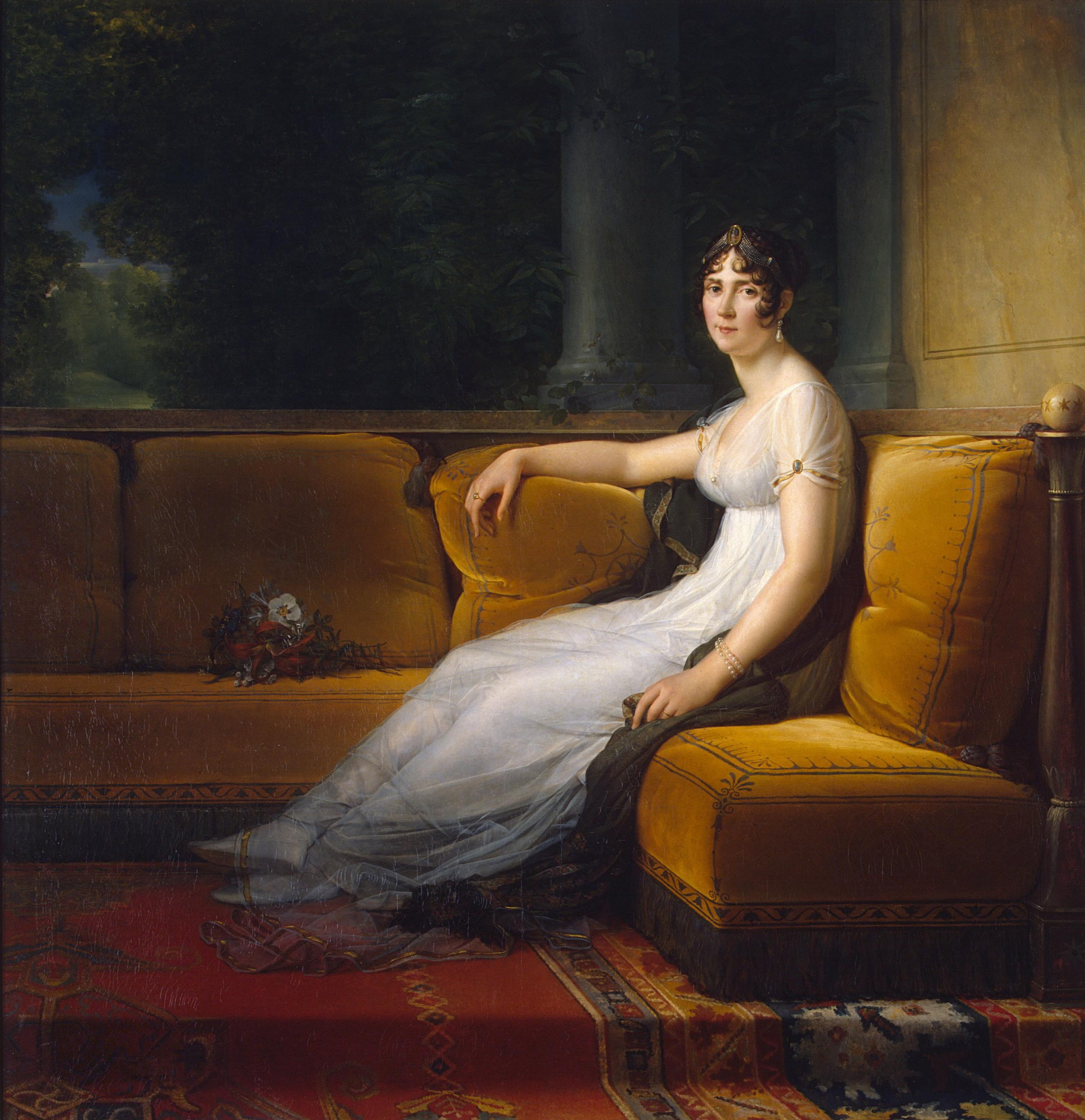
French Empresse Joséphine Bonaparte in a translucent muslin dress at the château de Malmaison, by François Gérard.

The Ostend Company came to Bengal at the beginning of the eighteenth century. They purchased textiles through agents and their own officials. When they found the business very profitable, they also made settlements in Dhaka.

Available statistics show that in 1747 the trade of Dhaka cotton goods (primarily Muslin), including local trade valued twenty-eight and a half lakh rupees.

== Decline ==
During the second half of 18th century, Bengal gradually came under the control of the British East India Company (EIC), particularly after Robert Clive's victory at the 1757 Battle of Plassey. Coming under Company rule meant that British-made goods produced with Indian cotton started to be sold in Bengal, which were sold at cheaper prices than the Bengali muslin industry could afford. At the same time, tariffs and other protectionist policies instituted by European nations led to a collapse in foreign demand for muslin, further weakening the industry. By the 19th century, the Industrial Revolution in Britain meant that the Bengali muslin trade could no longer compete against British-made textiles in Indian markets, and eventually collapsed. The Great Bengal famine of 1770, which killed a third of the Bengali population, also weakened the local muslin industry.

From 1787 to 1788, Dhaka suffered from severe natural calamities - especially heavy rainfall - and famine broke out. After the disaster, more emphasis was given on agriculture to reduce the effects of the famine. Tax was revoked on the exportation of grains. So, people became more interested in agricultural works than weaving as the wages of labourers and other people working in agriculture suddenly rose. From 1782 to 1787, the Industrial Revolution began in Britain, and fine cotton was produced locally. During the period of Company rule, the muslin industry declined due to various EIC policies, which supported imports of industrially manufactured textiles from Britain. A duty of 75 percent was imposed on export of cotton from Bengal. These measures ultimately led to the decline of muslin trade in Bengal. In 1811, Bengal was still a major exporter of cotton cloth to the Americas and the Indian Ocean. However, Bengali exports declined over the course of the early 19th century, as British imports to Bengal increased, from 25% in 1811 to 93% in 1840.

== Revival ==
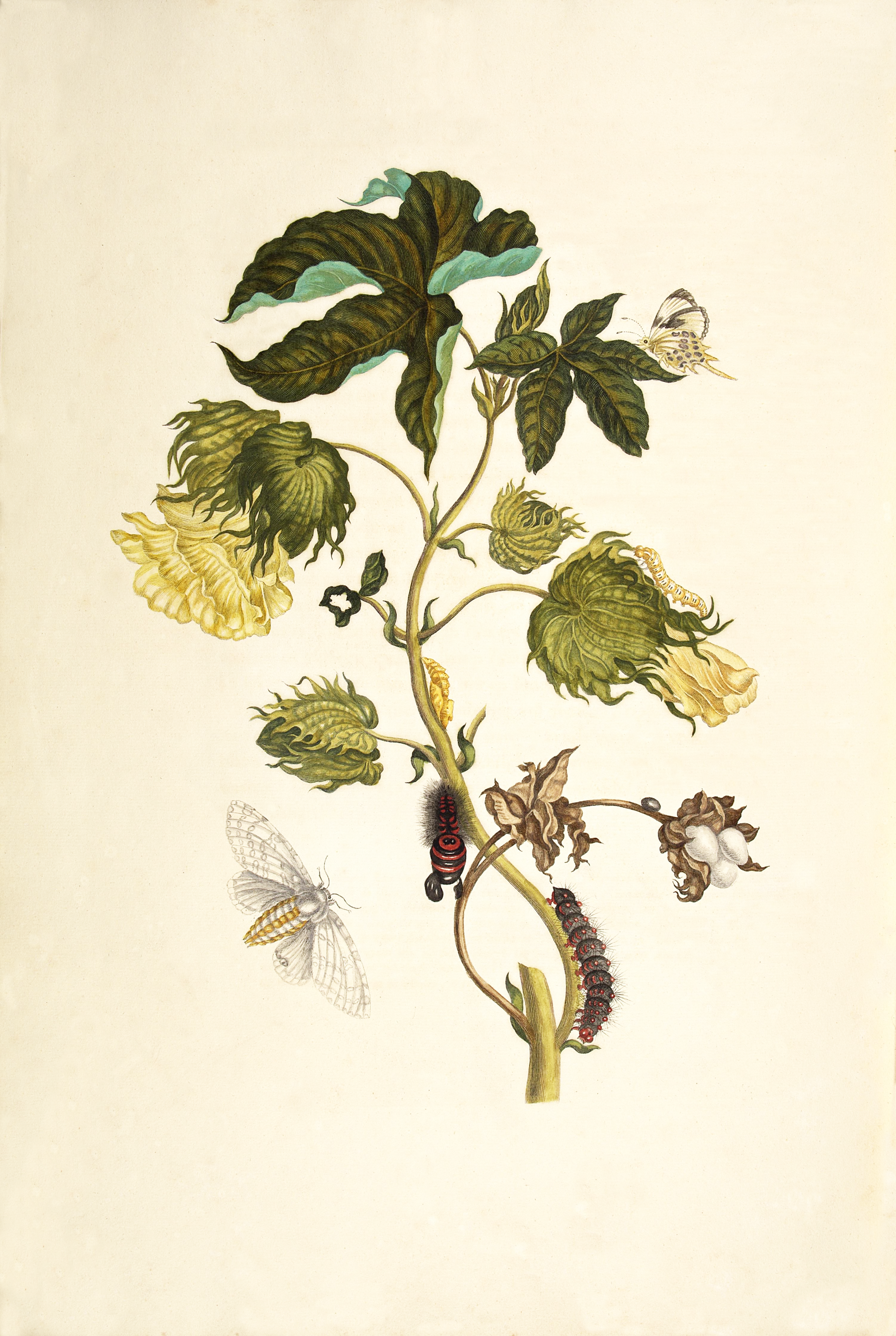
Tree cotton: flowering and fruiting stem with life cycle of caterpillar and moth, by Maria Sibylla Merian.

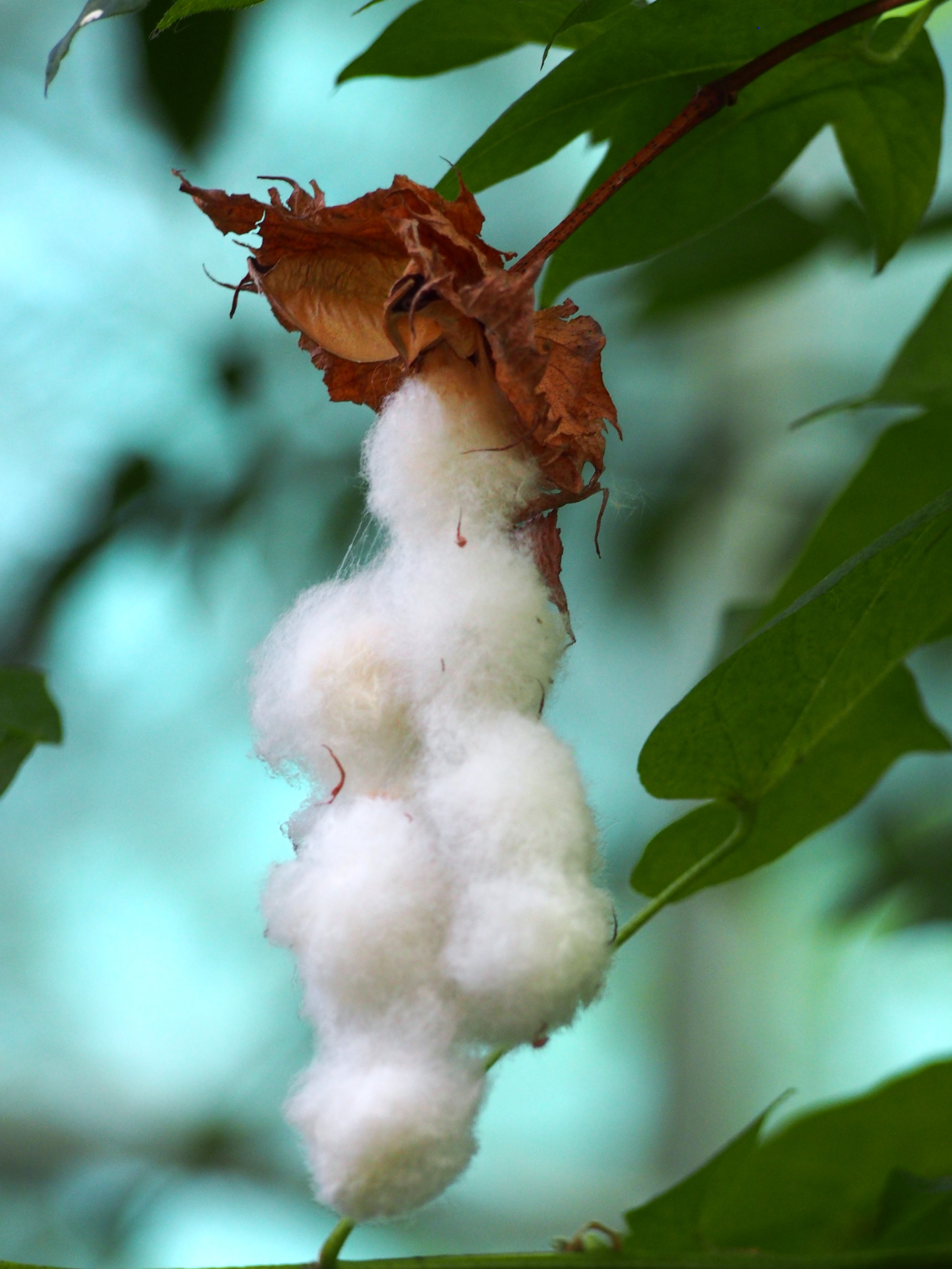
Tree cotton cultivated in a greenhouse in Botanical Garden of the Botanic Garden of the Jagiellonian University in Kraków, Poland.

The Dhaka muslin begins with plants grown along the banks of the Meghna River and its tributaries, which form the immense Ganges Delta. The famous "phuti karpas" (Gossypium arboreum var. neglecta) with their maple-like leaves pushed produce a single light-yellow flower twice a year, which give way to a snowy floret of cotton fibers. Unlike the long, slender strands produced by the Central American gossypium hirsutum, which makes up 90% of the world’s cotton today, gossypium arboreum produced threads that are stumpy and easily frayed. Craftspeople tamed the threads with a series of ingenious techniques developed over millennia. The fibers of the "phuti karpas" were not suitable for making the cheap cotton cloth using industrial machinery so it nearly vanished.

Muslin sarees were woven in Bangladesh by a group of researchers under a government grant project in 2020. As of 9 March 2022 the thread count has reached 731. The exceptional muslin has secured recognition of Geographical Indication (GI) as a product of Bangladesh.

== See also ==
- Textile industry in Bangladesh
- History of Bengal

== Notes ==
- Ahmedullah, M (21 February 2014), From Muslin To Museum: The Rise and Fall of Bengal's Textile Empire-1,2 & 3, Alochonaa (Dialogue)
