= Sirte (disambiguation) =

Sirte is a city in Libya.

Sirte may also refer to:

== Military ==
- First Battle of Sirte (17 December 1941), World War II
- Second Battle of Sirte (22 March 1942), World War II
- Battle of Sirte (2011), Libyan Civil War

== Other uses ==
- Sirte Basin, an oilfield beneath Sirte province and the Gulf
- Sirte Declaration, a 1999 resolution to create the African Union
- Sirte Oil Company, a Libyan oil company
- Gulf of Sirte, on Libya's coast

== See also ==
- SIRT (disambiguation)
- Syrtis (disambiguation)
