= Sorath =

Sorath may refer to:

- Saurashtra (region), also known as Sorath, a region of Gujarat, India
- Sorath (raga), a raga in Indian music
- Sorath Rai Diyach, a romantic folktale in Sindhi and Gujarati literature
- Sorath (Shakugan no Shana), a character in the Japanese light novel series Shakugan no Shana
- Sorath, a small Australian game development team that produced Devil Daggers and Hyper Demon

== See also ==
- Saurashtra (disambiguation)
- Surat (disambiguation)
