= Surat (disambiguation) =

Surat is a city in Gujarat, India.

Surat may also refer to:

== Places ==
- Surat (Lok Sabha constituency), the city's parliamentary constituency
- Shortened for Thailand’s Surat Thani Province and Surat Thani City
- Surat district, a local government unit in India
- Surat, Iran, a village in Iran
- Surat, Puy-de-Dôme, a commune in France
- Surat, Queensland, a town in Australia
- Georges Seurat, a French post-Impressionist artist

== Other uses ==
- Surat (ship)
- Surti (disambiguation)
- Surat Thani (disambiguation)
- Sorath (disambiguation)
- Saurashtra (disambiguation)
- Surat, Broach and Other Old Cities of Goojerat, a book by British-Indian civil servant Theodore Hope
- Koy Sanjaq Surat, a modern Syriac language
- Surat cotton, a short staple cotton on the genus Gossypium arboreum
- Surah, a division of the Quran
- Surat Sukha, a Thai footballer
