= Surat Thani (disambiguation) =

Surat Thani may refer to these places in Thailand:

- the town Surat Thani
- Surat Thani Province
- Mueang Surat Thani district
- the Roman Catholic Diocese of Surat Thani
- Surat Thani Airport
- Monthon Surat Thani, a former administrative entity
- Surat Thani FC

== See also ==
- Surat (disambiguation)
