= Surti =

Surti indicates relationship with the city of Surat in India. It may refer to:

- A member of the Gujarati people resembling a stereotypical resident of Surat in the state of Gujarat, India
- A dialect of the Gujarati language spoken in and around Surat
- Surti buffalo, a type of water buffalo from Gujarat
- Surati goat, breed of goat from Surat
- Surti paneer, paneer (curd cheese) from Surat
- Surti Kistaiya, Indian politician from Madhya Pradesh
- Abid Surti, Indian cartoonist and writer from Surat
- Mehul Surti, Indian musician from Surat
- Mohammed Surti, Indian National Congress politician from Surat
- Rusi Surti, Indian cricketer from Surat

== See also ==
- Surat (disambiguation)
- Syrtis (disambiguation)
