= SIRT =

SIRT may refer to:

- Selective internal radiation therapy for cancer
- Serious Incident Response Team, Nova Scotia, Canada
- Sirtuin, a class of proteins (enzymes) related to genetics
- Staten Island Railway (from abbreviation Staten Island Rapid Transit)

== See also ==
- Siirt, a city in Turkey
- Sirt, another name for Sirte, a city in Libya
- Sirte (disambiguation)
