= Palkar =

Palkar may refer to:

- Saurashtra people, Hindu community of South India
- Saurashtra language, their Indo-Aryan language

== See also ==
- Saurashtra (disambiguation)
