= Saurashtra =

Saurashtra may refer to:

- Saurashtra (region), also known as Sorath, a region of Gujarat, India
  - Kathiawar Peninsula, also called Saurashtra Peninsula, a peninsula in western India
  - Saurashtra (state), alias United State of Kathiawar, a former Indian state, merged into Bombay State and since its dissolution part of present Gujarat
  - Saurashtra Railway, a former railway company, merged into Western Railway zone and since its dissolution part of present Indian Railways
  - Saurashtra cricket team, a cricket team based in Gujarat, India
  - Saurashtra people, people in South India originally from Saurashtra
  - Saurashtra language, the Indo-Aryan language spoken by Saurashtrains
    - Saurashtra alphabet
    - Saurashtra (Unicode block)

== See also ==
- Saraostus, Greek name for Saurashtra
- Sorath (disambiguation), alternative name for the region
- Surat (disambiguation)
- Palkar (disambiguation), another name for the people and language
- Kathiawari (disambiguation)
