= Panam Nagar =

Ancient city in Bangladesh

- পানাম নগর (Bengali)
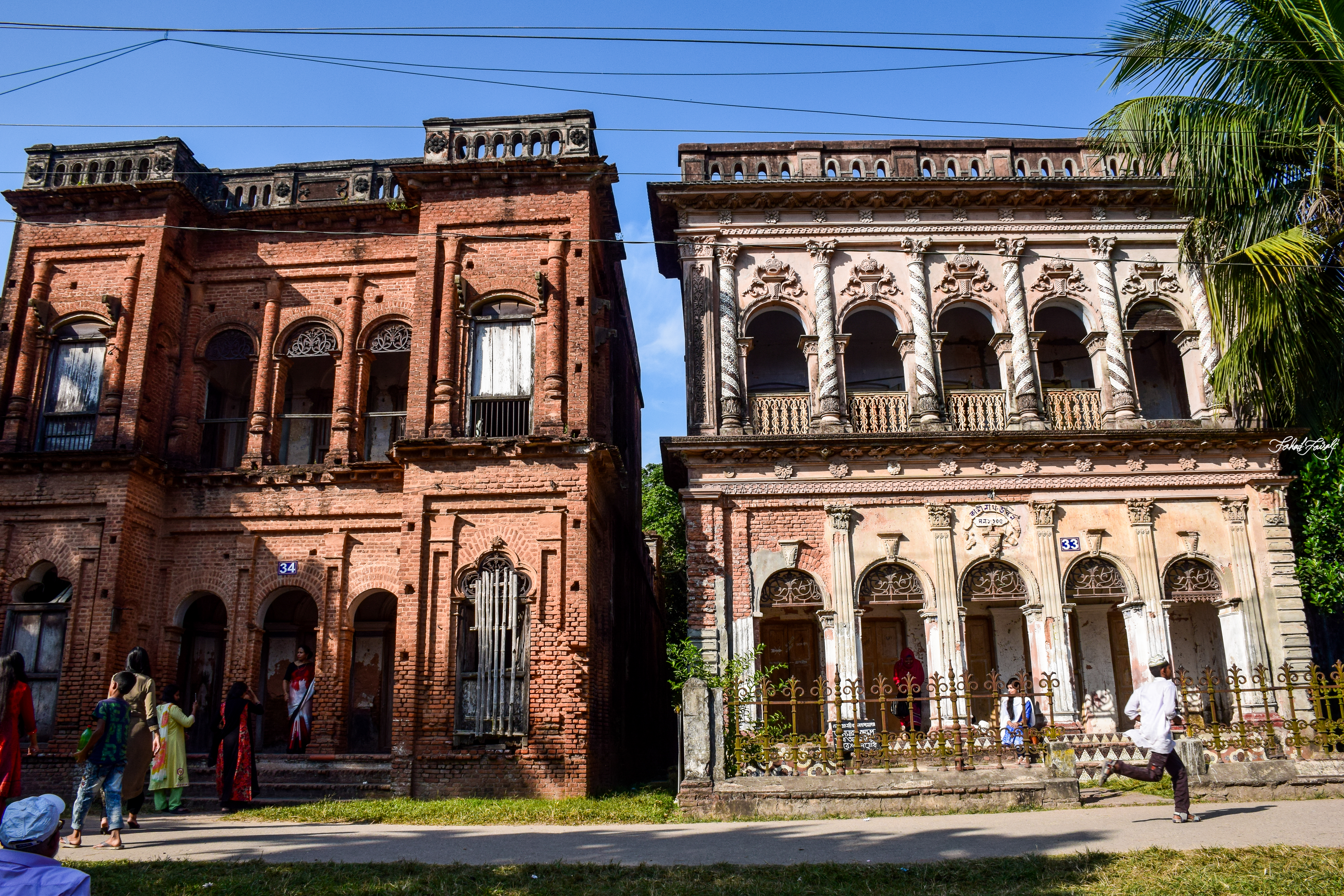

- Location within Bangladesh
- 23.6560°N 90.6042°E
- Location: Sonargaon Upazila, Narayanganj District, Bangladesh

History
- Founded: Late 13th century

Site notes
- Architectural styles: British, Mughal
- Owner: Department of Archaeology, Bangladesh

Panam Nagar (Bengali: পানাম নগর, romanized: panam nogor, lit. 'Panam City') was an ancient settlement in Bangladesh, a portion of archaeological remains of which is situated at Sonargaon Upazila in Narayanganj District.

Panam Nagar traces its origins to the 13th century. Once a thriving commercial centre, it declined in the 17th century following the relocation of the capital from Sonargaon. The area experienced a revival in the 19th century when wealthy Hindu merchants redeveloped it during the British colonial period, revitalising its commercial importance as a hub for cotton fabric trade. However, the partition of India and riots in 1964 led to its abandonment. Despite subsequent occupation, Panam Nagar was eventually freed and declared an archaeological site in the 2000s. Today, it stands as a collection of dilapidated buildings along a single street, with ongoing restoration efforts aimed at preserving its rich historical legacy.

== Description ==
=== Layout ===
The historic township, located near the present-day capital of Dhaka and containing the only surviving relics of the Panam area, extends along a narrow, winding street approximately 600 metres in length and 5 metres in width. Panam Nagar is flanked by canals on both sides. The northern waterway is known as Pankhiraj Canal.

=== Architecture ===
Three distinct architectural styles, spanning two historical periods, are evident in Panam Nagar: Mughal, British colonial, and a hybrid form. Whilst ancient pre-Muslim relics are absent, and Muslim-era remnants are scarce, Mughal architectural elements are still discernible. These include cusp moulding above door and window apertures, ogee-shaped windows, rectangular facade panels, floral surface embellishments, and small niches with pointed arches.

The predominant structures are Hindu landlords' residences, constructed in a colonial style. This approach amalgamates Western technological and structural principles with classical Mughal design elements. Despite the buildings' Western decorative aesthetics, the spatial planning remained fundamentally local in character.

The early colonial phase saw the emergence of a hybrid style, serving as a transitional link between Mughal and colonial architectural traditions. Buildings erected during this intermediary period generally retained the bold, dominant Mughal style whilst gradually incorporating contemporary European architectural features.

=== Buildings ===
The site comprises 52 buildings, consisting of two- and three-storey structures facing one another. Of these, 31 are situated on the northern side of the street, whilst 21 are on the southern side.

The establishments incorporate architectural elements from the Sultanate, Mughal, British, and colonial civilisations. The buildings of Panam Nagar can be categorised into four types:

- Central hall: Buildings constructed with double-height main hall rooms as the primary focus in the plan layout. For example, building number 26.
- Central courtyard: Buildings that feature an internal open central courtyard. Building number 840 is an example of this type.
- Consolidated: Buildings that lack any internal hall room or courtyard. For example, building number 22. Majority of the buildings in the site are of this type, mostly single-storied.
- Compartment: These are smaller structures without internal space articulations. There are five such small buildings in the settlement.

== History ==
=== Early history ===
The term "Panam" is believed to have Persian origins, meaning "shelter". Historical accounts suggest that the Panam area was part of the capital city of Sonargaon during Hindu rule in the late 13th century. In the 15th century, Isa Khan, who led the Baro-Bhuyans, established the Bhati region in this area. He designated Panam as the capital, after which Sonargaon was administered from Panam. Of the three cities comprising ancient Sonargaon—Boro Nagar, Khash Nagar and Panam Nagar—Panam Nagar was regarded as the most appealing. During the Mughal era, several key infrastructural elements were constructed, including the Panam Bridge, Dalalpur Pool, Panamnagar Bridge, and a highway, establishing a direct link between Panam Nagar and the capital. As Sonargaon's commercial significance waned following the relocation of the capital to Dhaka in the 17th century, the Muslim population migrated to the new seat of power.

=== Revival ===
In the 19th century, the township of Panam Nagar began to develop within a small section of the abandoned, overgrown region. This coincided with Sonargaon's rise to prominence as a hub for cotton fabric trade, particularly muslin, under the British East India Company and colonial period. During this period, affluent Hindu merchants (taluqdars) settled in the area, renovating ancient abandoned buildings that bore the hallmarks of colonial architecture. In 1900, the Sonargaon G. R. Institution was established to provide education in Panam. Panam Nagar remained a thriving community until the partition of India in 1947. Local elders recount that in the evenings, the city would come alive with the sound of brass utensils and the glow of oil lamps.

=== Decline ===
By 1947, the upper-class residents of Panam had largely relocated to Calcutta (now Kolkata). Following the East Pakistan riots of 1964—during which miscreants looted buildings and destroyed valuable muslin—and the Indo-Pakistani War of 1965, the Hindu inhabitants migrated to India. Consequently, Panam Nagar was reduced to an uninhabited township. In 1965, the abandoned properties in Panam Nagar were declared as 'Enemy Property'. This declaration theoretically transferred ownership of the township to the government. However, the buildings were gradually reoccupied by local residents.

=== Restoration ===
In 2001, the Department of Archaeology initiated efforts to renovate the area, declaring it a protected archeological site in 2003. However, the renovation work was criticised for destroying the archaeological beauty of the buildings and eventually stopped following opposition from local civil society and experts. Illegal occupants were completely removed by 2009, and visitors are required to buy tickets since 6 October 2015. Notably, in 2006, the New York-based World Monuments Fund included Panam Nagar in its World Monuments Watch List of 100 Most Endangered Sites.

On 13 August 2020, a six-person committee was formed, comprising university lecturers and architects, to provide their views and conduct research on a restoration project. Subsequently, restoration work was launched on 21 December.

== In popular culture ==
A docu-drama Subarnagram was made in 2010 about the history and heritage of Panam Nagar. The 2011 film Guerilla, directed by Nasiruddin Yousuff, used it as a filming location.

== Gallery ==
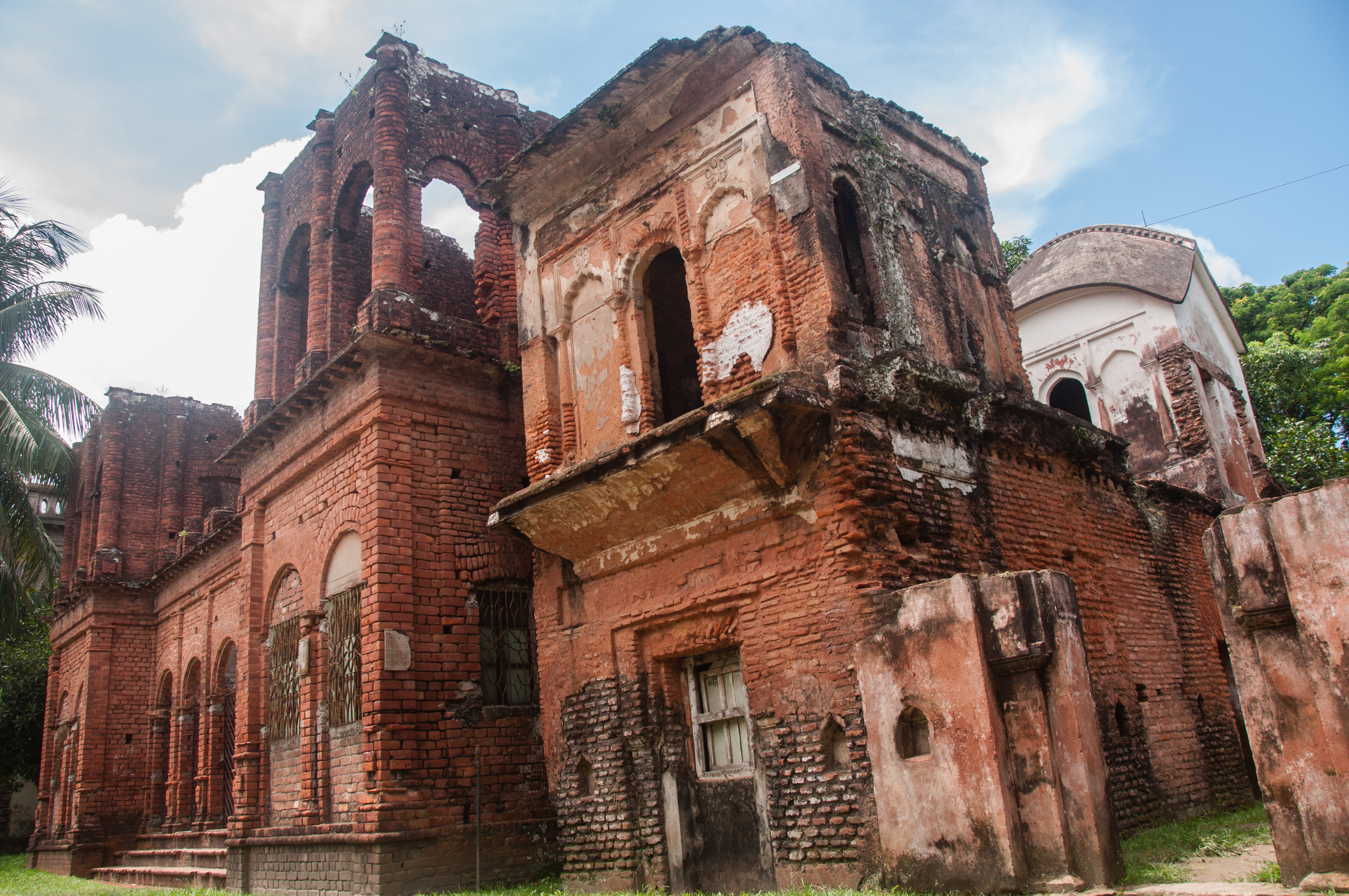
An abandoned building showcasing eclectic architectural influences

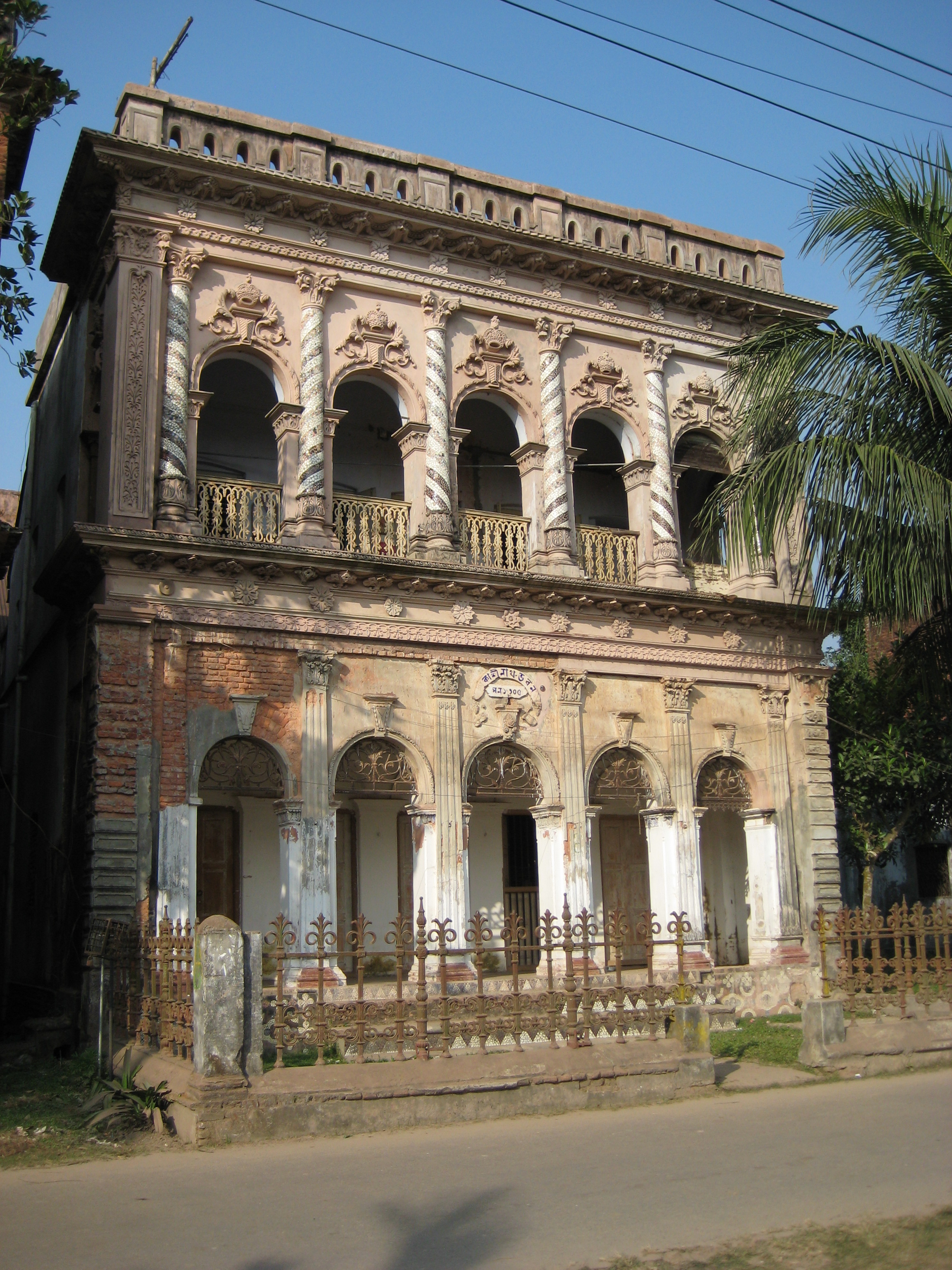
Kashinath House (#38), built in 1898 AD

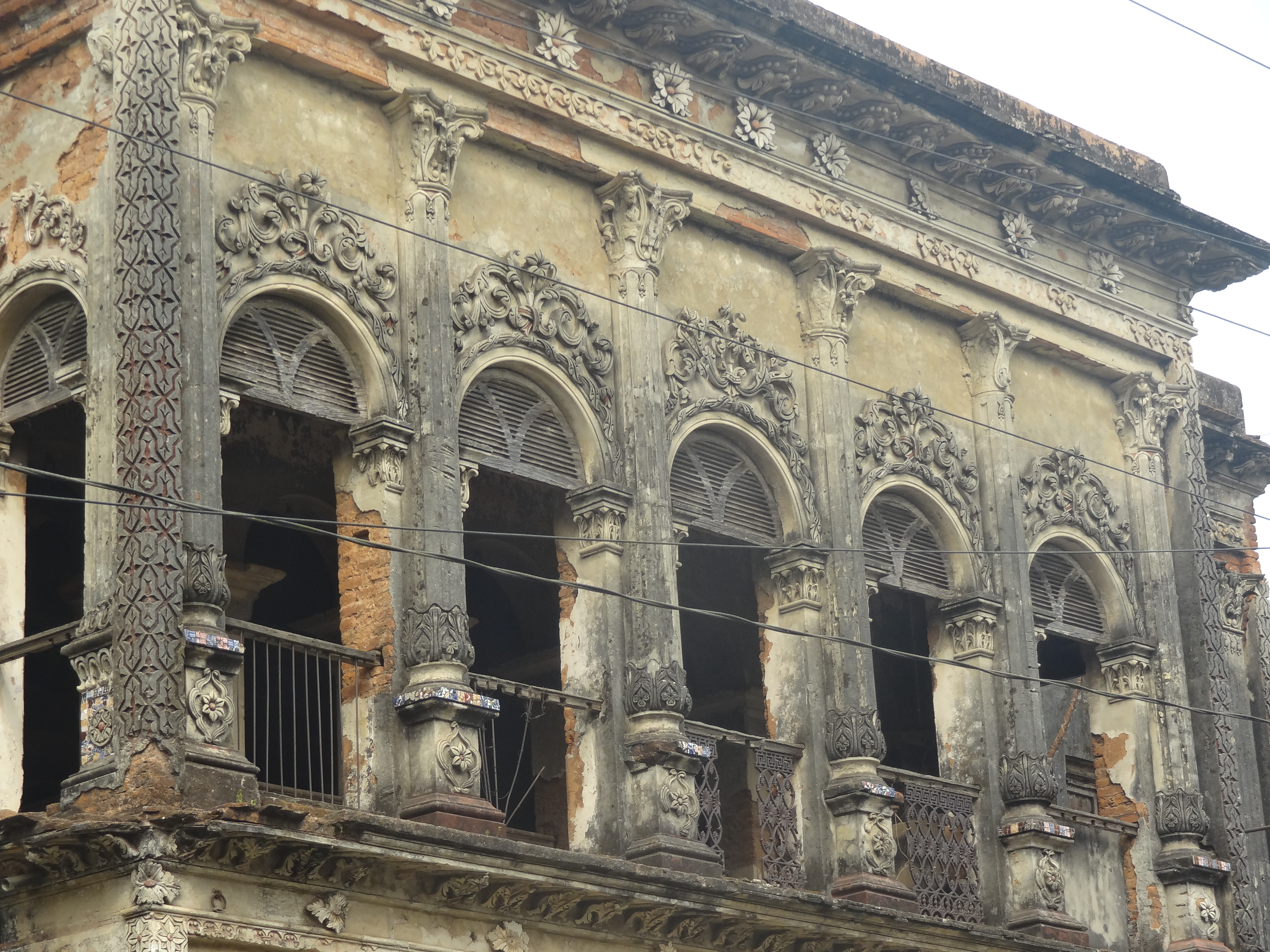
Choto Sardar Bari

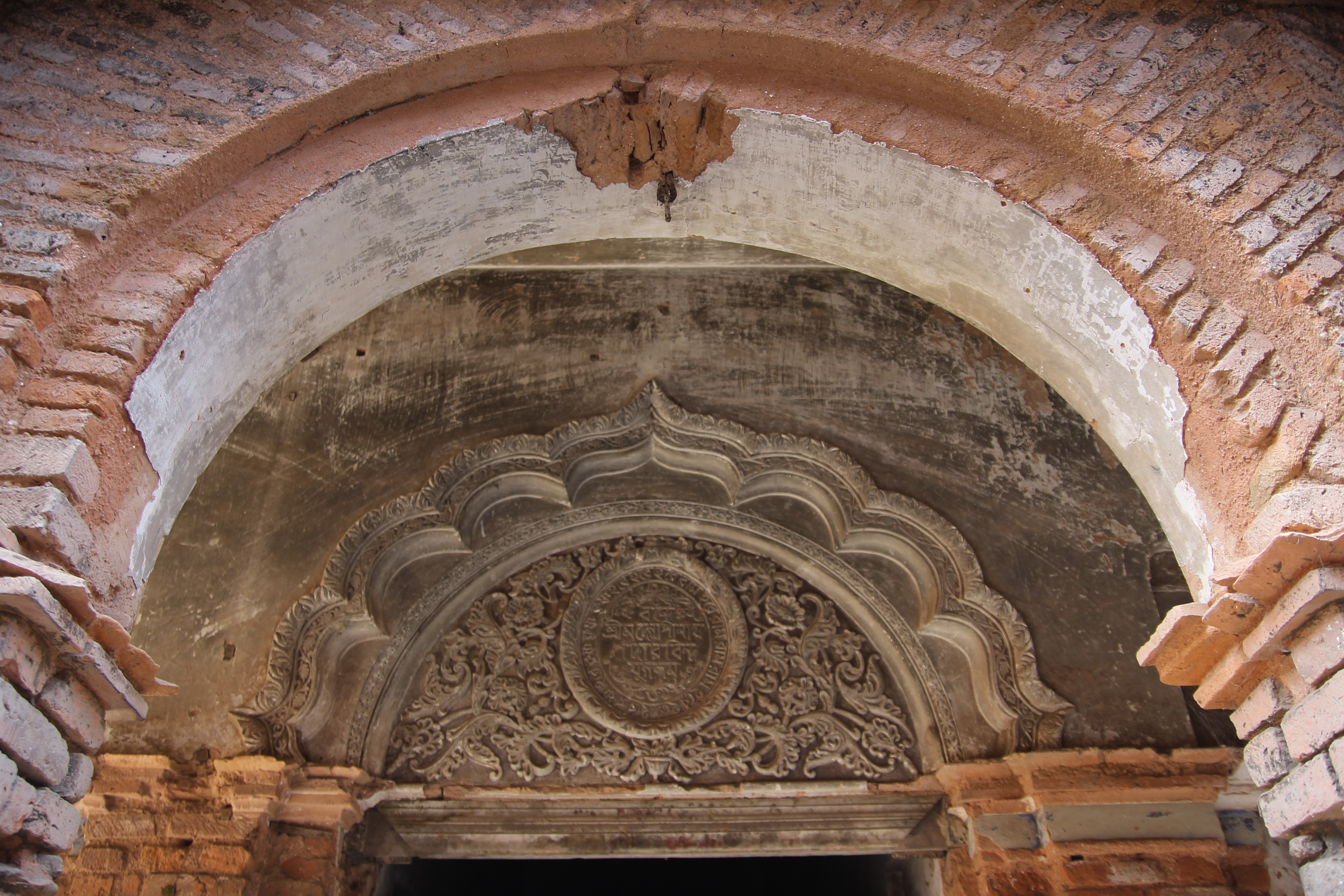
Hindu religious inscription on stucco relief under a Mughal-style arch.

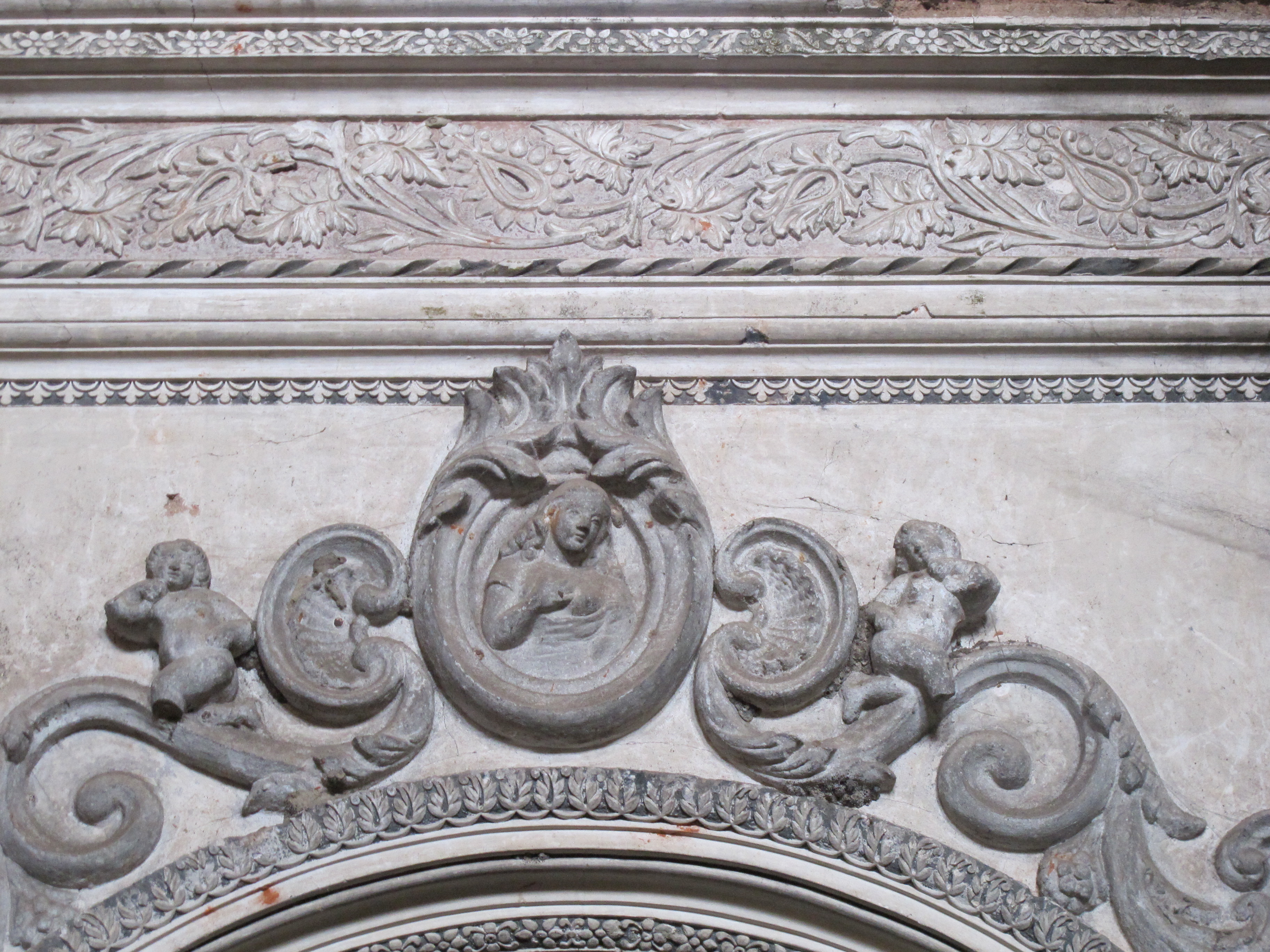
Stucco ornament over a door

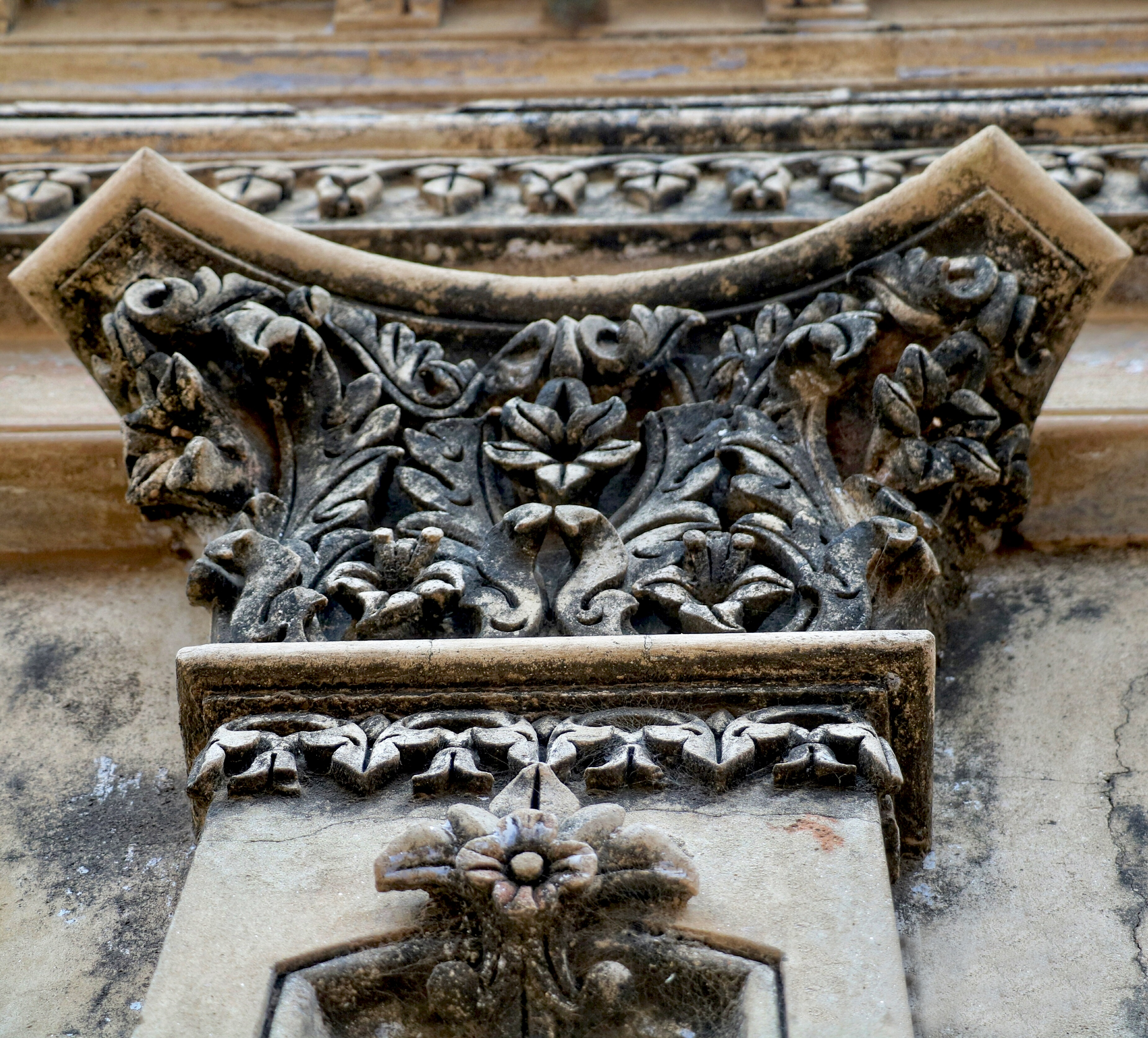
Column capital with stucco ornament

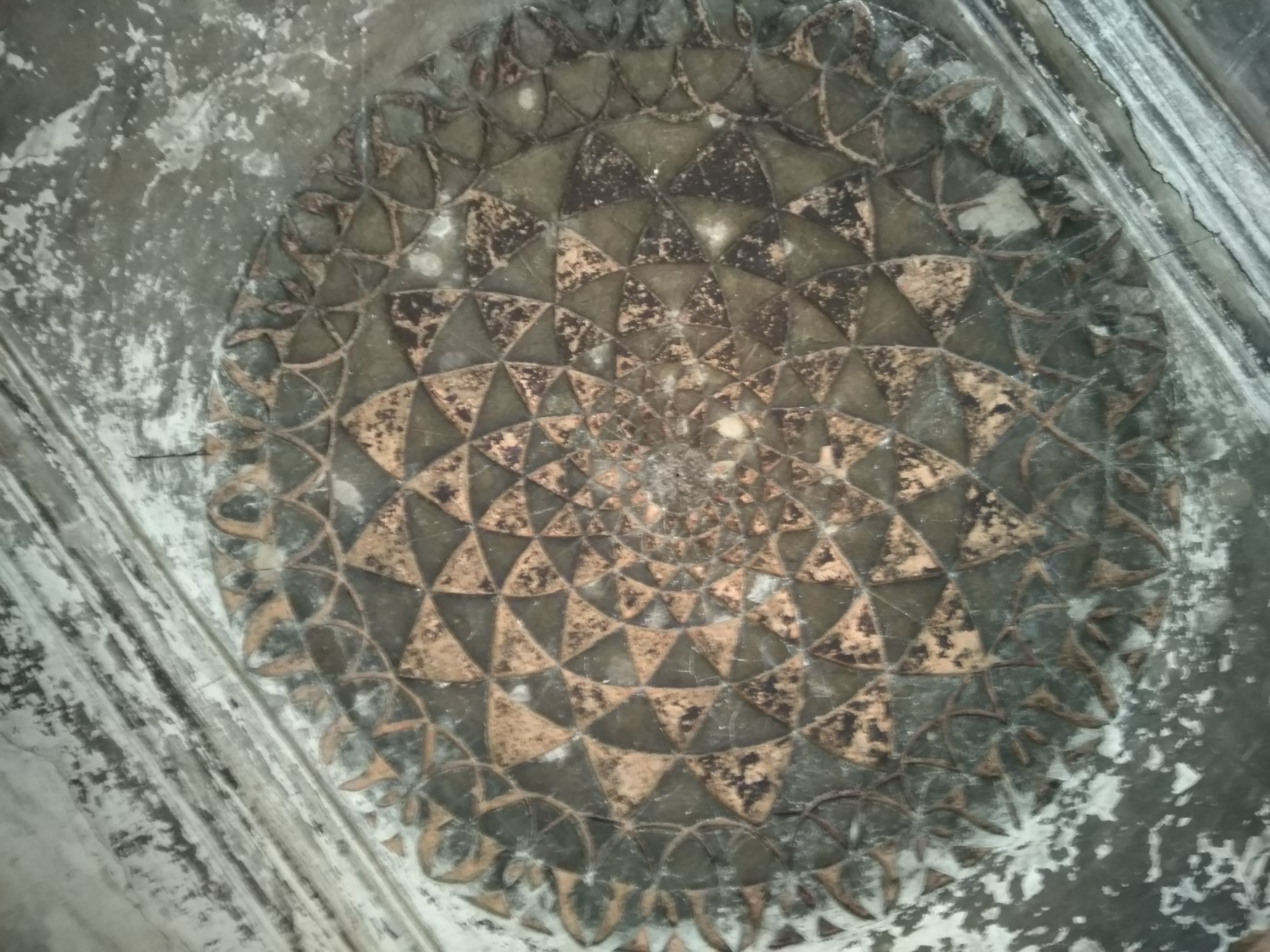
Ornate ceiling

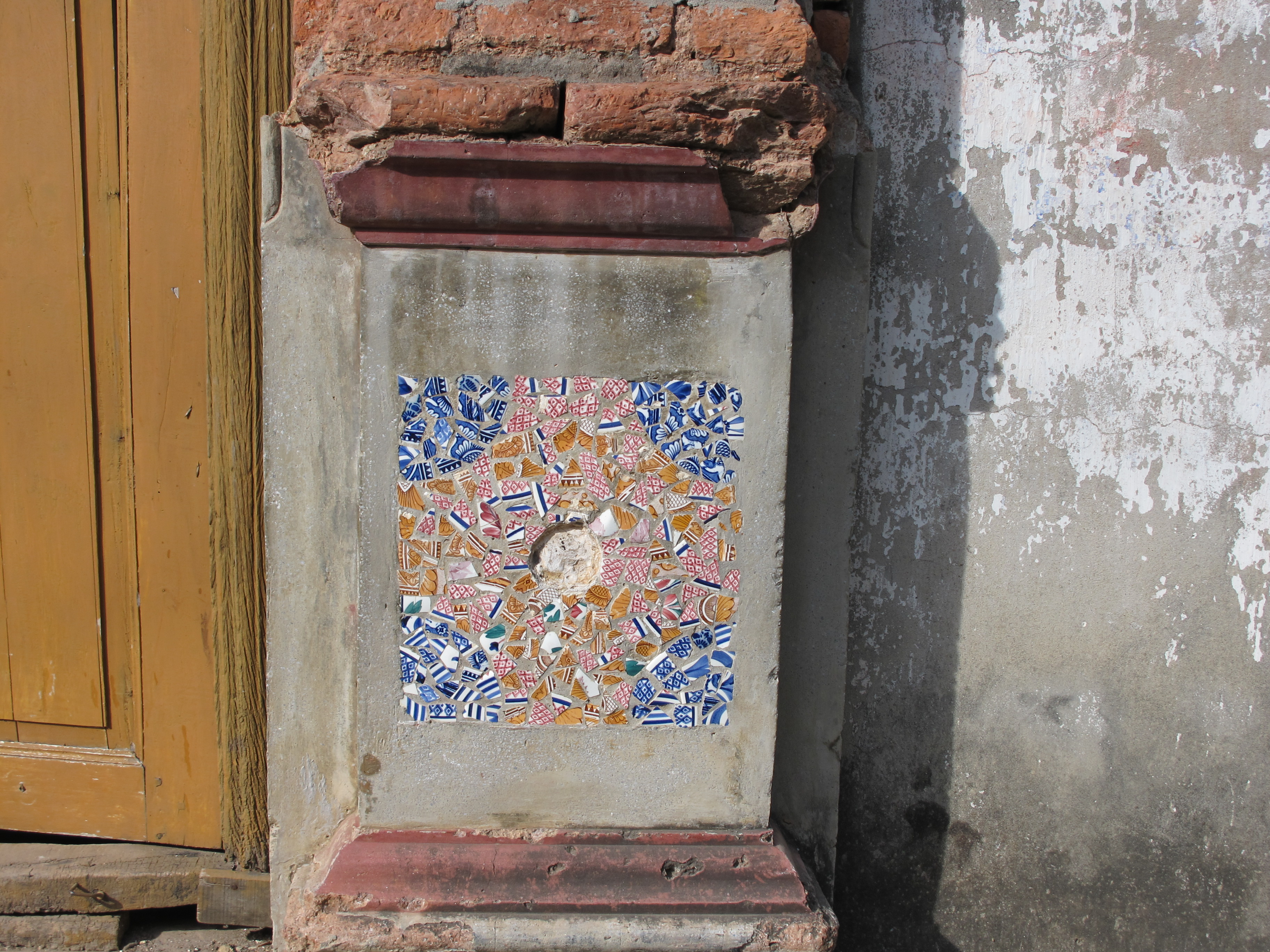
Mosaic plaque by a front-door

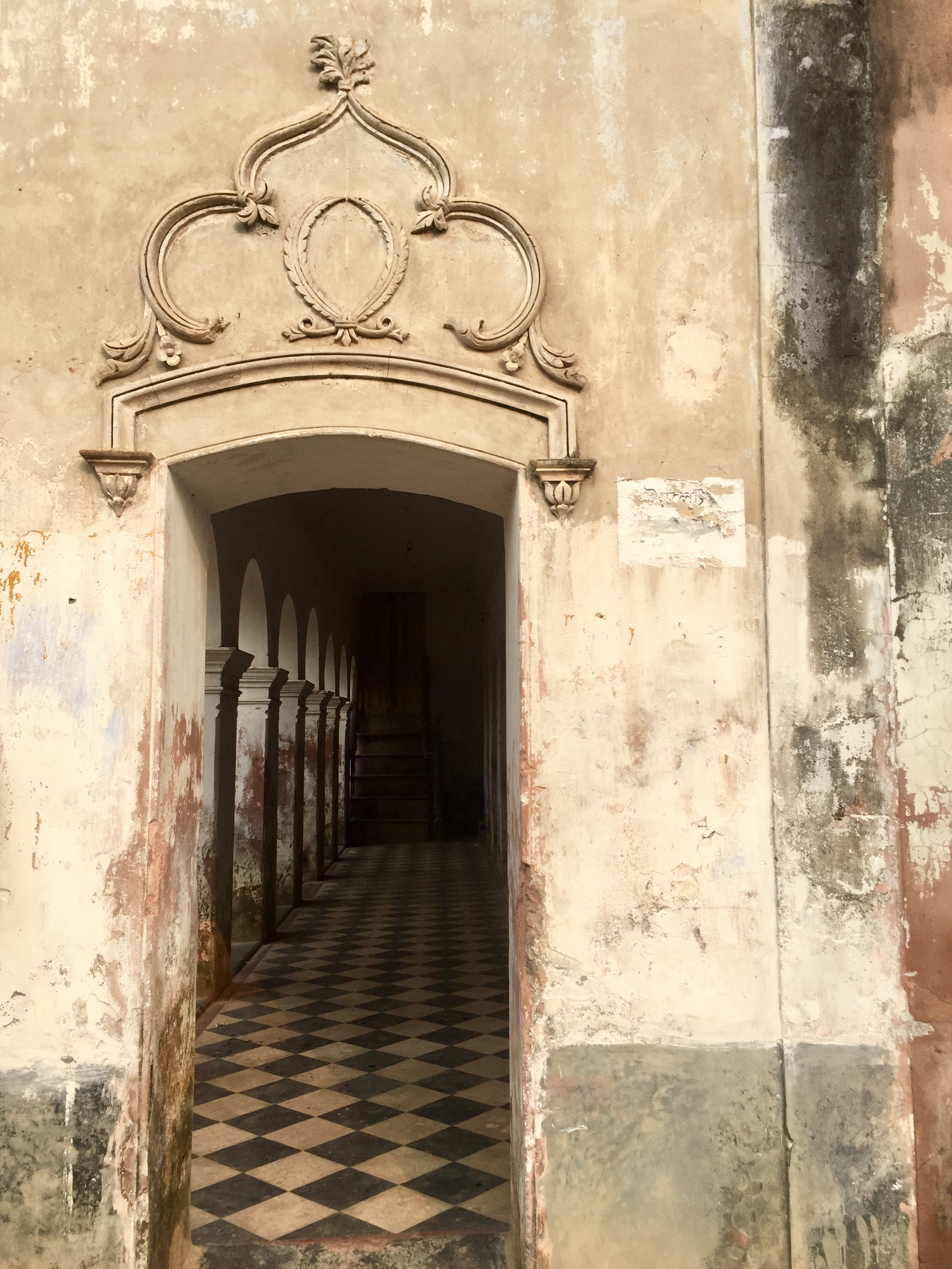
Checkered floor interior

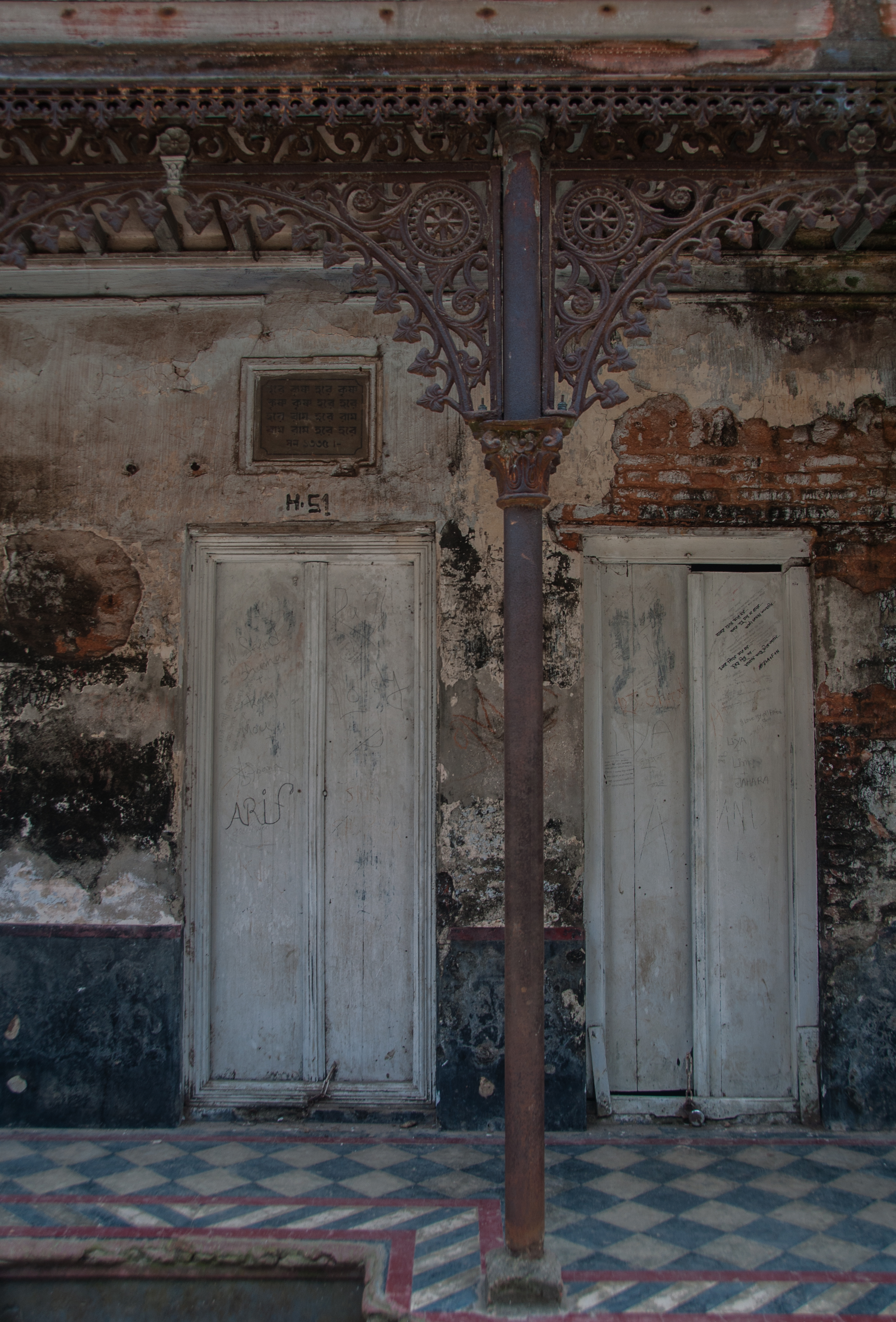
Cast iron column and arch opening with floral ornamentation (building #31, built in 1928 AD)

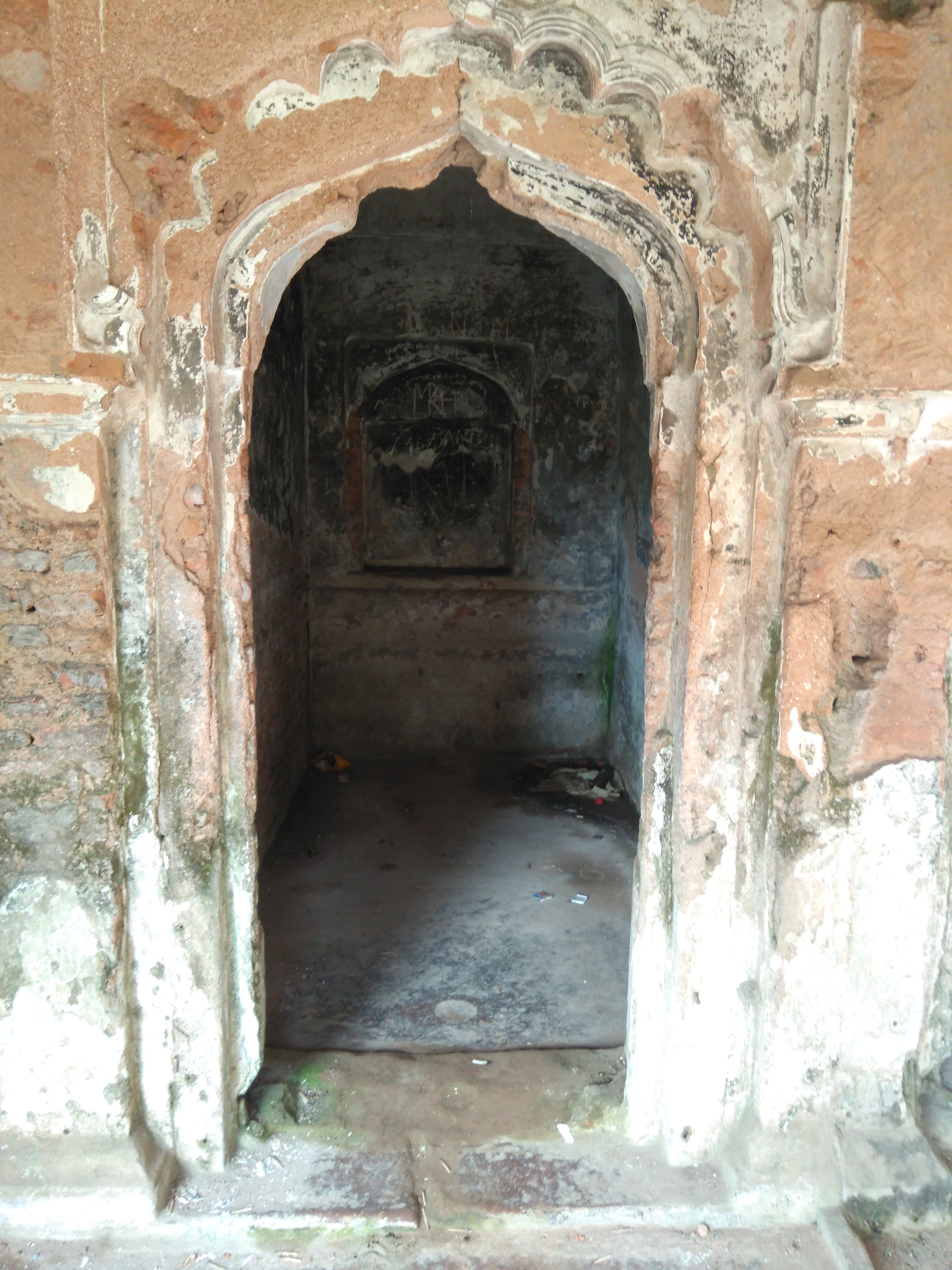
Mughal-style arch over a door.

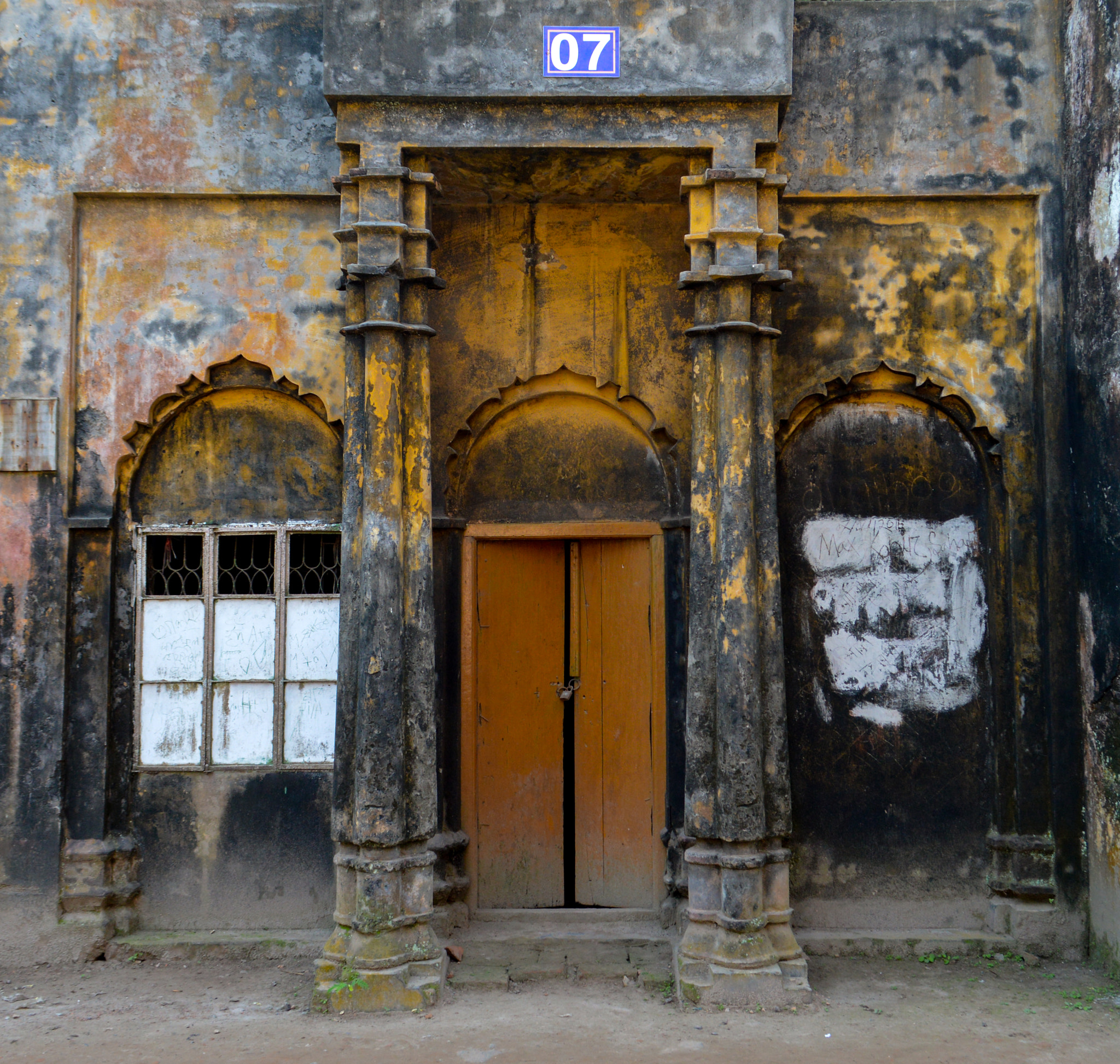
Islamic-style facade.

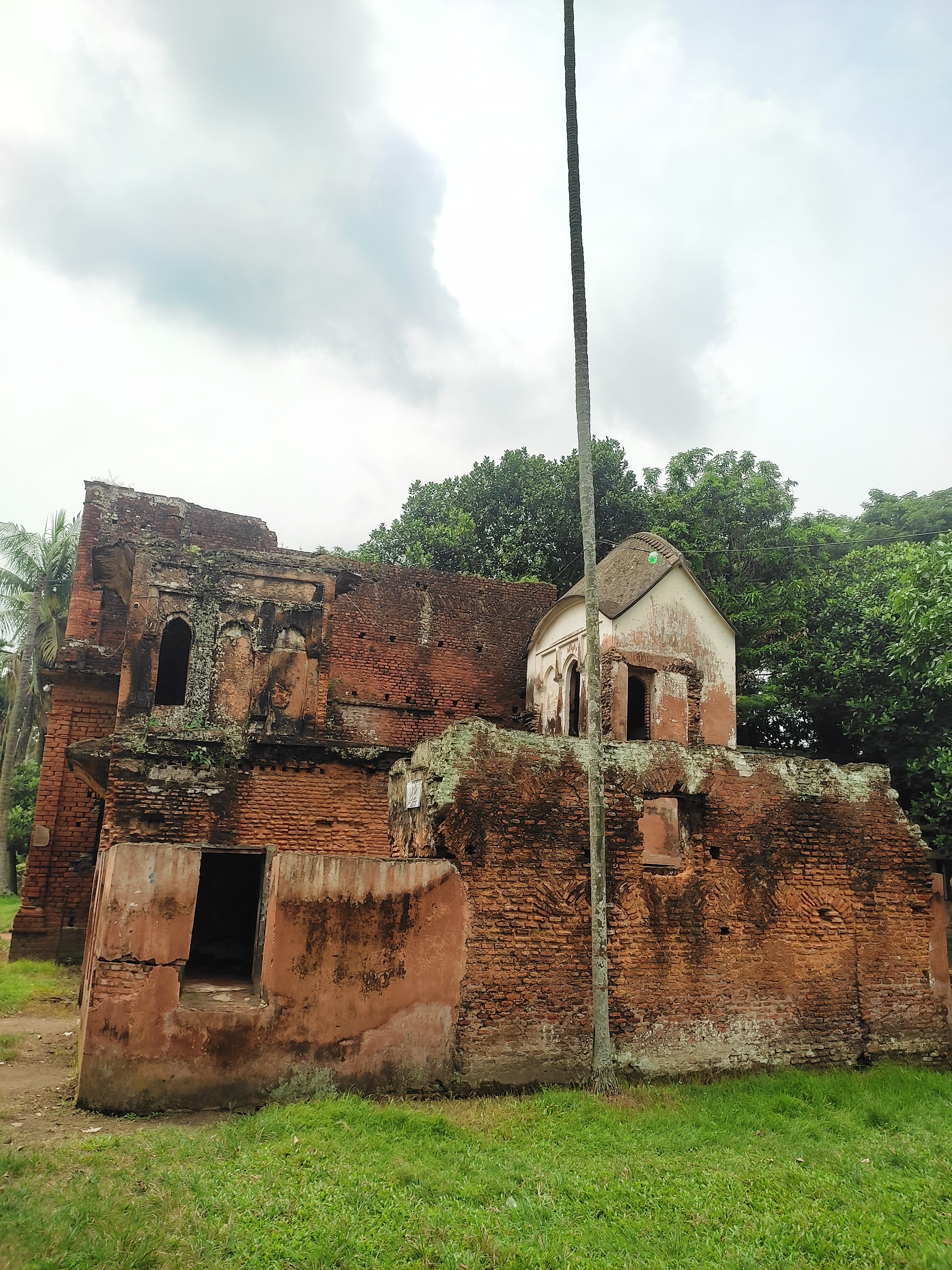

== See also ==
- List of archaeological sites in Bangladesh
