= Phuti karpas =

Variety of Gossypium arboreum endemic to Bangladesh

Phuti karpas or phuti karpash, is a variety of Gossypium arboreum endemic to Bangladesh, especially near Dhaka along the river banks. It was believed to be extinct. The cotton from this plant was used to make Dhaka muslin, a rare extinct fabric. The explorer Marco Polo described Dhaka muslin as “the finest and most beautiful cottons that are to be found in any part of the world". It could be spun so that individual threads could maintain tensile strength at counts higher than any other variety of cotton. Collected in the Kew Gardens Herbarium are four specimens of Gossypium Arboreum Var. Neglecta. The oldest one in the collection was collected by Joseph Dalton Hooker in 1848 in Sikkim, a region in Northern India between Nepal and Bhutan that includes Darjeeling. In 2015, in a project to resurrect muslin, phuti karpas plants are being searched by planting similar plants along the river.

== Description ==
Phuti karpas was a perennial herbaceous plant with soft droopy stem. The green venous leaves were palmate, and deeply divided into three lobes.

Phuti karpas would produce flowers twice a year and had very short fibers. These fibers needed special conditions, like selective humidity and temperature to be converted into yarn.

George Watt describes the plant as:

"A large pyramidal bush, chiefly grown as a field crop, though some times hardly more than 18 inches in height. Stems very often reddish-coloured (especially so in the finer grades of Dacca cotton). Leaves some- what leathery, but rather thin, though coarse -looking, and often rigid and the lobes furrowed and corrugated; lobes 3-5-7, with the supplementary teeth often within the sinuses appearing on the base of the central lobe > lobes linear-lanceolate, undulate, the bottom pair spreading square or almost backwards, acute, rarely bristle-tipped, densely coated with long spreading hairs, with below these a coating also of stellate hairs. Inflorescence short lateral shoots, 2-4-flowered. Flowers mostly two together on very short pedicels, yellow with purple centres, or yellow to white with a purple tinge, often never fully expanded, convolute. Bracteoles very large, with greatly developed lateral (basal) ears, ovate-acute, toothed, more than half the length of the corolla. Fruit (boll) ovate -acuminate, 3-4-celled. Seeds small, beaked, with a brownish or greenish fuzz and a large quantity of coarse, harsh, woolly, and very short staple."

== Distribution and cultivation ==
The main cultivation area of phuti karpas was very small, along the high banks of the rivers Meghna, Shitalakshya and the Brahmaputra and its branches near Dhaka. The cultivation of phuti karpas was stopped by the end of the 18th century.

The variety of the cotton plant is believed to be extinct. In 2015, in a non-government project to resurrect Muslin, seeds of plants similar to Gossypium arboreum var. neglecta were planted along the river banks of Meghna in Kapasia, 30 km north of Dhaka, Bangladesh. 70% similarity with phuti karpas was found by searching along the river banks in Gazipur, Mymensingh and Chittagong Hill Tracts. Government venture to revive Muslin was implemented by Bangladesh Handloom Board, Cotton Development Board and University of Rajshahi which found six similar species to phuti karpas out of 39 collected samples from Cumilla.

== Geographical indications ==
"Dhakai Phuti karpas cotton" is registered as the 39th GI product of Bangladesh. Furthermore the "plant and seed of Dhakai phuti karpas cotton" has been listed on the Geographical Indication Journal by Department of Patents, Designs and Trademarks (DPDT) awaiting recognition after application was filed by Bangladesh Handloom Board.
