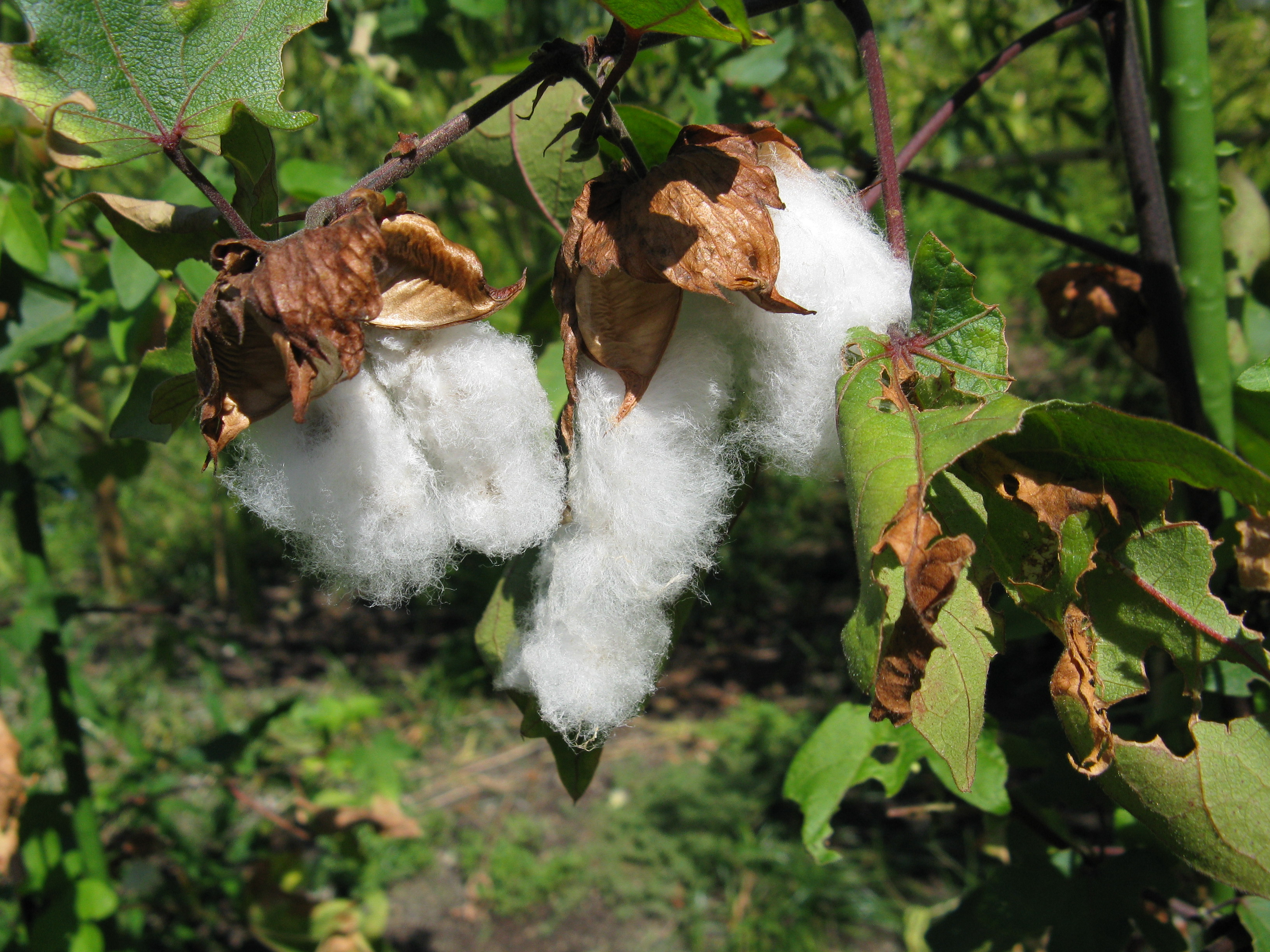
- Seed capsules on a cultivated specimen in Osaka, Japan

Conservation status
- Near Threatened (IUCN 3.1)

Scientific classification
- Kingdom: Plantae
- Clade: Tracheophytes
- Clade: Angiosperms
- Clade: Eudicots
- Clade: Rosids
- Order: Malvales
- Family: Malvaceae
- Genus: Gossypium
- Species: G. arboreum

Binomial name
- Gossypium arboreum L.

Synonyms
- Gossypium albiflorum Tod.; Gossypium anomalum G.Watt; Gossypium arboreum var. wightianum (Tod.) M.R.Almeida; Gossypium asiaticum Raf.; Gossypium bani (G.Watt) Prokh.; Gossypium cernuum Tod.; Gossypium comesii Sprenger; Gossypium figarei Tod.; Gossypium glabratum Tod.; Gossypium gracile Salisb.; Gossypium herbaceum var. wightianum (Tod.) T.Cooke; Gossypium indicum Lam.; Gossypium intermedium Tod.; Gossypium macranthum Tod.; Gossypium nanking Meyen; Gossypium neglectum Tod.; Gossypium obtusifolium Roxb. ex G.Don; Gossypium obtusifolium var. wightiana G.Watt; Gossypium perennans Delile ex Roberty; Gossypium puniceum Fenzl; Gossypium roseum Tod.; Gossypium roxburghii Tod.; Gossypium royleanum Tod.; Gossypium rubicundum Roxb. ex Wight & Arn.; Gossypium rubrum Forssk.; Gossypium sanguineum Hassk.; Gossypium soudanense (G.Watt) G.Watt; Gossypium vaupelii J.Graham; Gossypium wattianum S.Y.Hu; Gossypium wightianum Tod.; Hibiscus albiflorus Kuntze; Hibiscus cernuus (Tod.) Kuntze; Hibiscus nangking Kuntze; Xylon indicum (Lam.) Medik.

= Gossypium arboreum =

Species of flowering plant

Gossypium arboreum, commonly called tree cotton, is a species of cotton native to India and Sri Lanka. There is evidence of its cultivation as long ago as the Indus Valley Civilisation of the Indus River for the production of cotton textiles. The shrub was included in Linnaeus's Species Plantarum published in 1753. The holotype was also supplied by him, which is now in the Linnean Herbarium in the Swedish Museum of Natural History.

== Description ==
Tree cotton is a shrub that grows to about one to two meters tall. Its branches, which are purple in color, are covered with fine hairs. Stipules are present at the leaf base and they are linear to lanceolate in shape and sometimes falcate (i.e. sickle-shaped). The leaves are attached to the stem by a 1.5 to 10 cm petiole. The blades are ovate to orbicular in shape and have five to seven lobes, making them superficially resemble a maple leaf. The lobes are linear to lanceolate, and often a tooth is present in the sinus. Glands are present along the midrib or occasionally on the adjacent nerves. The leaves are glabrescent, meaning the pubescence is lost with age, but when it is present on young leaves, it is both stellate (i.e. star-shaped) and simple.

The flowers are set on short pedicels (i.e. flower stalks). An epicalyx is present, which is a series of subtending bracts that resemble sepals. Its large, ovate segments are dentate (i.e. toothed along the margins), though sometimes only very slightly so. They are cordate (i.e. heart-shaped) at the base and acute at the apex. The true calyx is small, measuring only about 5 millimetres (0.20 in) long. Its shape is cupular, and five subtle dentations are present. The corolla is a pale yellow on colour, sometimes with a purple centre, and occasionally entirely purple. It measures 3 to 4 centimetres (1.2 to 1.6 in) long. The staminal tube bears the anthers and is 1.5 to 2 cm in length. The fruit is a three- or four-celled capsule measuring 1.5 to 2.5 centimetres (0.59 to 0.98 in) across. It is ovoid or oblong in shape and glabrous (i.e. hairless). The surface is pitted and a beak is present at the terminal end. The seeds within are globular and are covered in long white cotton.

A type known as "phuti karpas", was used to make Dhaka muslin in Bengal, now Bangladesh. The variant could only be grown in an area south of Dhaka, along the banks of the Meghna River. It could be spun so that individual threads could maintain tensile strength at counts higher than any other variant of cotton.
