= Syrtis =

Syrtis (Ancient Greek: Σύρτις) may refer to:

== Places ==
=== North African coast ===
- Syrtis Major (or the Great[er] Syrtis) is the Latin name for the Gulf of Sirte, a body of water in the Mediterranean Sea on the northern coast of Libya
- Syrtis Minor (or the Lesser Syrtis) is the Latin name for the Gulf of Gabès, a body of water in the Mediterranean Sea on the eastern coast of Tunisia

=== Mars ===
- Syrtis Major Planum is a "dark spot" (an albedo feature) located in the boundary between the northern lowlands and southern highlands of Mars
- Syrtis Minor, another of the classical albedo features on Mars

=== Antarctica ===
- Syrtis Hill, a prominent snow-free hill on Alexander Island, Antarctica

== Other uses ==
- HMS Syrtis (P241), a UK Royal Navy submarine launched in 1943 and sunk in 1944
- Syrtis, one of the three fighting realms in the Regnum Online MMORPG

== See also ==
- Sirtis
- Sirte
- Surti Muslims
- Surti (disambiguation)
