= Dhaka muslin =

Fine textile

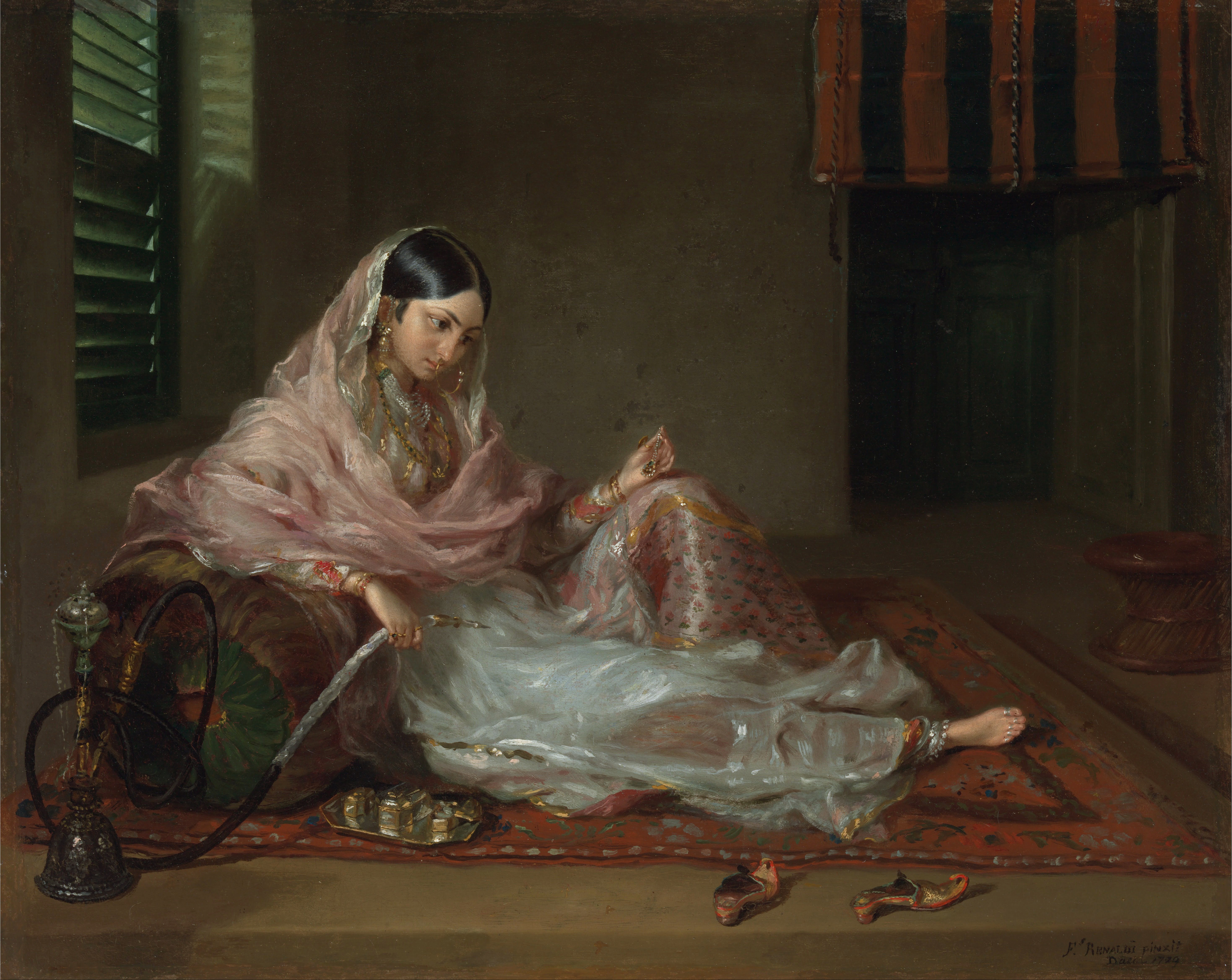
A woman in Dhaka wearing Dhakai muslin. Francesco Renaldi, 1789.

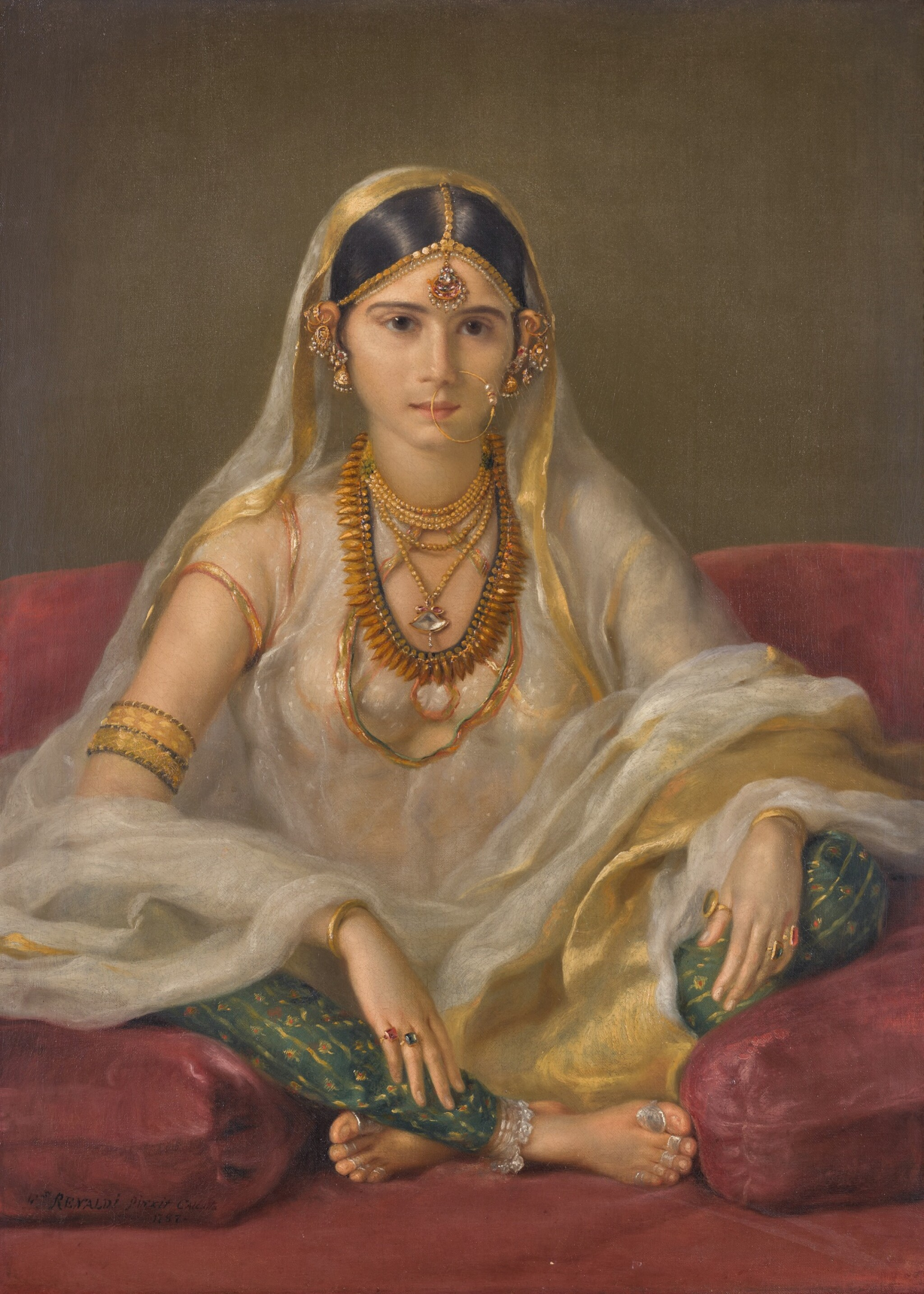
Another portrait of a woman wearing Dhaka muslin by Francesco Renaldi, 1787, Metropolitan Museum of Art

Dhaka muslin (Dhakai malmal) was an extraordinarily fine handwoven cotton textile produced in Dhaka (the modern-day capital city of Bangladesh), from at least the early medieval period through the 18th century. Renowned as “woven air,” it was prized by Mughal emperors and European nobility alike for its extreme lightness and transparency.

Its ultra-fine yarns (often ~300-count cotton spun from the endemic phuti karpas plant) yielded thread counts of 800–1,200 warp threads per inch, far exceeding typical muslins (40–80). Travelers across centuries marveled that a whole muslin sheet could be pulled through a ring. During the Mughal era (16th–18th centuries) Bengal – especially Dhaka and Sonargaon – became the global hub of muslin production. The fabric underpinned a vast trade to India’s courts and Europe.

Under British colonial rule, however, the industry was systematically crushed: machine-made imitations and punitive tariffs flooded markets, rural weavers fled or starved, and the special cotton variety was lost. Efforts since the late 20th century by scholars and artisans (and recent GI and UNESCO designations) seek to revive the craft.

== Historical origins ==
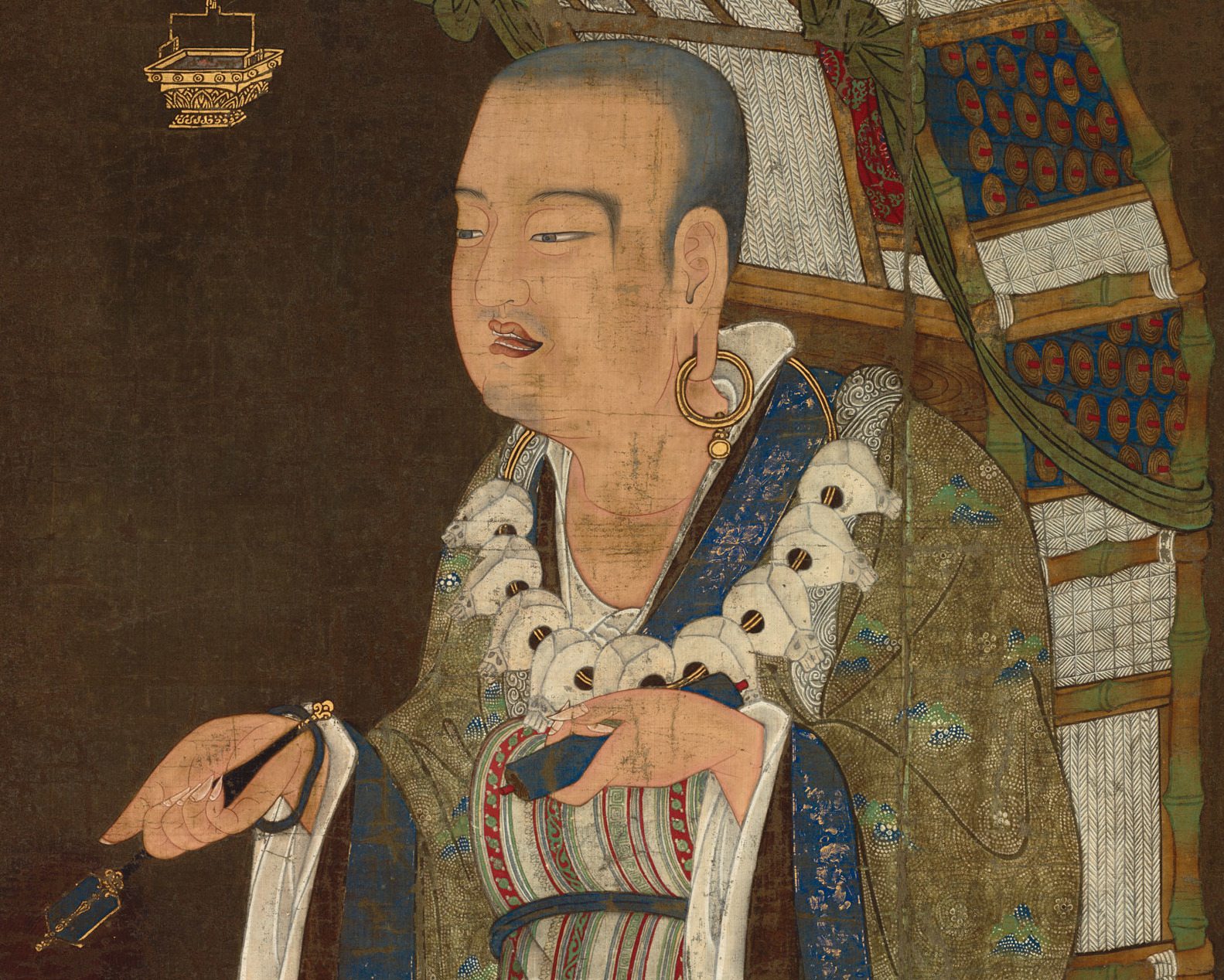
The Chinese pilgrim Xuanzang, who was astonished at the lightness of the fabric.

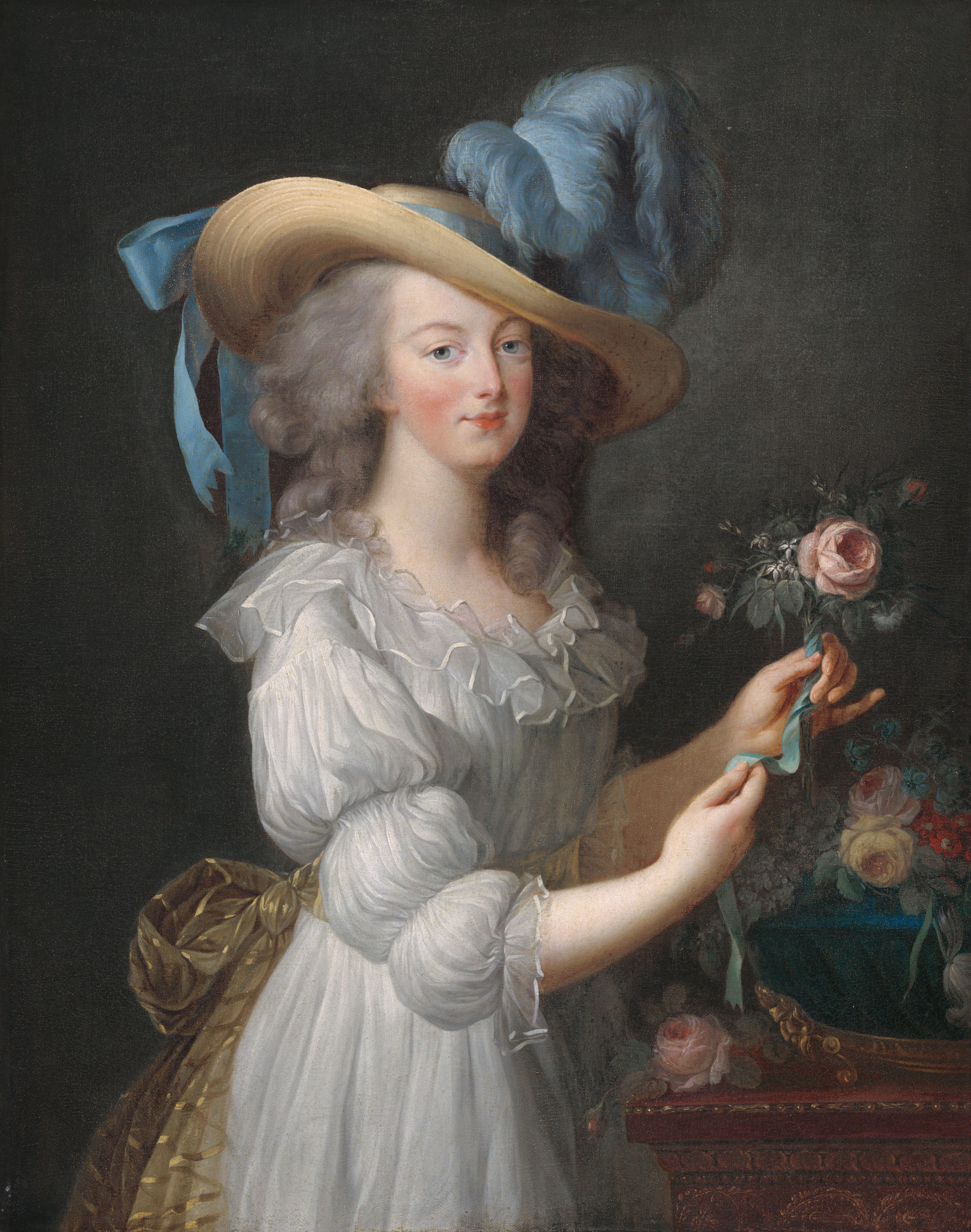
Marie Antoinette in Dhakai muslin.

Muslin production in Bengal dates to antiquity. A 7th-century Chinese pilgrim Xuanzang remarked that the cloth "is like the light vapours of dawn." A 9th-century Persian geographer (often identified as Sulaiman) recorded Indian cotton so fine "that a dress made of it may be passed through a signet-ring." In Central Asia, Dhaka Muslin was called "Daka".

By the medieval period, East Bengal (Dhaka, Sonargaon and islands of the Meghna delta) was famed for the finest plain-weave cottons. Under the Delhi Sultans and especially Mughal emperors, Dhaka became Bengal’s capital and its muslin became more widely accessible to international markets. In Emperor Akbar’s court (late 16th century), mulmul khas muslin was woven exclusively for royalty. Mughal sources and later travelers note the fabric's legendary qualities: Emperor Jahangir's court poet Abd al-Rahim allegedly said that the fabric seemed to "dance with the slightest breeze." Mughal chronicles (Ain-i-Akbari) list dozens of Dhaka muslin varieties given poetic names (e.g. abrawān "flowing water", shabnam "evening dew").

European travellers in the 16th–18th centuries echoed this admiration. The Englishman Ralph Fitch in 1586 wrote of Sonargaon (Dhaka region) "Great store of cotton cloth is made here. […] where the best and finest cloth made of cotton that is in all India." By the 18th century even Marie Antoinette and Jane Austen coveted Dhaka muslin. Notably, Mughal princess Zeb-un-Nisa once reportedly appeared before Emperor Aurangzeb in a "transparent" muslin court dress; when chided, she pointed out it comprised "seven separate layers of muslin."

== Geographic centers and workshops ==
Fine muslin was produced in a belt along the Ganges-Meghna delta. Dhaka itself was the premier market and regulatory center, but the actual weaving and spinning took place in many villages around Dhaka and Sonargaon. The region’s unique short-staple cotton (phuti karpas, Gossypium arboreum var. neglecta) grew only on the alluvial banks of the Meghna, roughly 10–15 miles southeast of Dhaka. Dhaka and nearby towns (e.g. Sonargaon, Panam Nagar) formed clusters of kothis (royal-run workshops) and arongs (market halls). The largest arong was at Panam Nagar (Sonargaon), where the East India Company even built a factory.

Smaller household workshops and riverside spinning camps dotted the countryside: spinners often worked on boats or in cool misty mornings along rivers. A typical workshop was a simple pit loom setup. Despite rural locations, the networks of weavers, dyers, and merchants were highly organized to serve imperial and export markets.

== Raw materials and technical characteristics ==
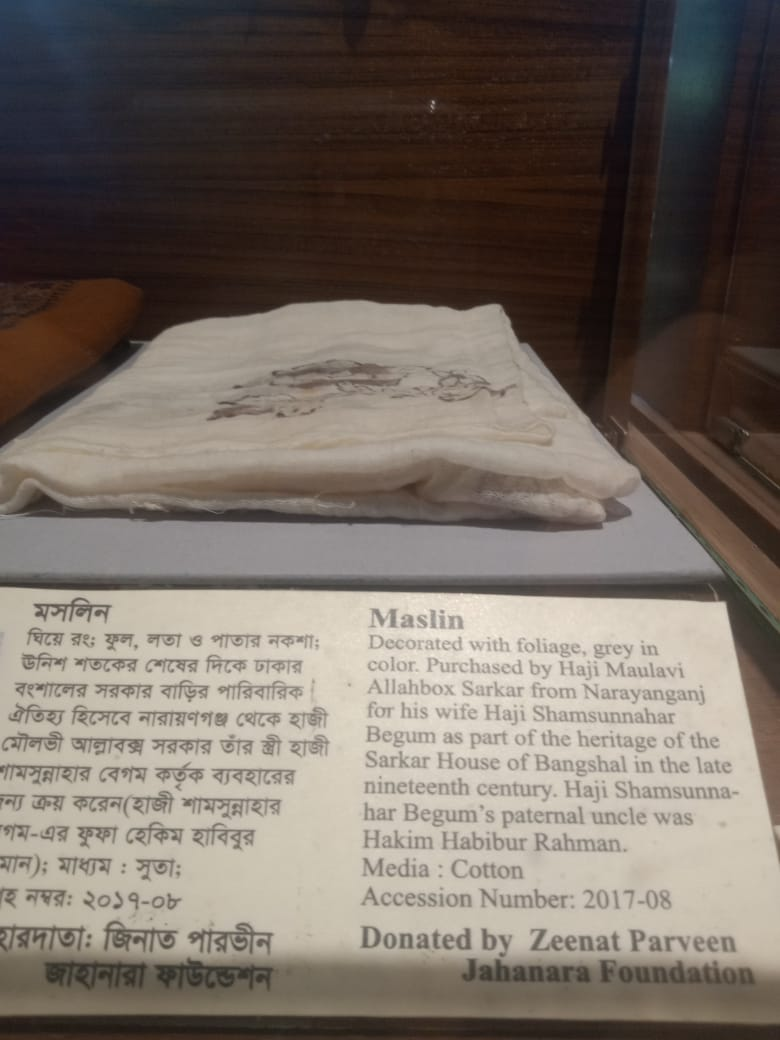
Image of Dhaka Muslin.

The defining raw material was the phuti karpas cotton plant. This local cotton (Gossypium arboreum var. neglecta) had extremely fine short staple fiber. As British Resident James Taylor noted in 1800, it grew only along a tract of Meghna riverbank southeast of Dhaka. Its fibers had a ribbon-like structure: when soaked, they shrank and flattened, giving unusual silkiness and strength to spun yarn. Even after colonial-era search, true phuti was considered extinct (though Bangladesh has recently found related strains).

The spun yarns were remarkably high-count. Mughal records imply a minimum of ~300s ("400, 500s cotton") was used for Dhaka muslin. Modern analysis of surviving muslin finds warp densities of 800–1,200 threads per inch, an order of magnitude above typical handloom cloth. By contrast, modern equivalents (even very fine Asian muslins) rarely exceed 100 TPI. The resulting fabric was ultra-light: one account estimates one square yard of muslin weighed only ~11 g.

The weave was a very even plain weave (Tabby) on a fine combed reed (shāna). Many elaborate Dhaka fabrics incorporated extra-weft motifs (jamdani style) or embroidery (chikankari) on the same fine ground. Historically, muslin thread counts are often compared: ordinary muslin ~40–80 TPI, high-end jamdani 100–200, Dhaka muslin 800–1,200. These metrics explain legends that a whole muslin sheet could pass through a ring or that it resembled “a spider’s web”. It was so sheer that Victorian women were scandalized by its transparency (wives of nobles joked muslin-wearers were effectively naked).

== Economic and trade impact ==
Under the Mughals, Dhaka's muslin was a linchpin of the economy. Dhaka became "the world capital of weaving," exporting handloom cotton globally. Merchants carried muslin to Persia, Arabia, Europe and Southeast Asia; it was a perennial source of empire revenue. By the 17th century, Bengal supplied much of Europe’s fine cotton demand: Francisco de Braganza (English factory at Dhaka) recorded huge shipments, and French explorer Tavernier noted Dhaka muslin was seen in Persian, Turkish and French markets. Prices were accordingly high – woven cloth sold for many pounds sterling per yard. (One oft-repeated apocryphal claim is that a pound of Dhaka muslin cost 26 times more than silk; precise price data is scarce, but it was clearly a luxury export.)

Trade was facilitated by Dhaka's port and artisan guilds. The Tanti Sangha (weavers' guild) coordinated production and sold to East India Company and Mughal court agents. Large-scale shipments went via Calcutta and Chittagong to Europe. In Bengal society, muslin-weaving villages were prosperous. Nawabs and zamindars profited via taxes and patronage. Mughal emperors dispensed muslin as tribute and diplomatic gifts (wrapped sacred texts and relics) to signal prestige. In this era, muslin underwrote Bengal's "richly developing textile economy".

== Social and cultural significance ==
As a status symbol, Dhaka muslin had enormous cultural cachet. Mughal nobility adorned themselves in muslin for court and ceremonial occasions. Empress Nur Jahan and Emperor Jahangir famously wore embroidered muslin gowns in portraits. Muslim rulers also used muslin sarongs (cummerbunds) and liturgical banners. Among the aristocracy, owning muslin signified refinement and piety; it was often given as royal khilat (robe of honor) or kept in treasuries.

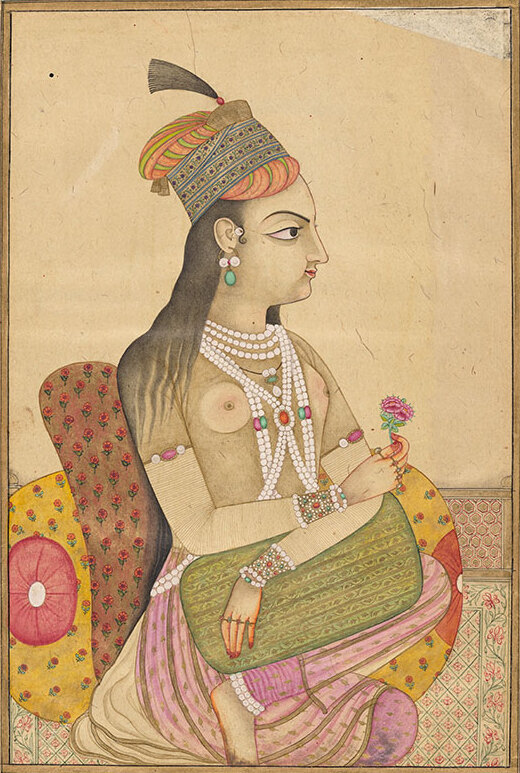
Zeb-un-Nissa, who was perceived as naked by her father even after wearing 7 layers of dhakai muslin

Several stories highlight its social impact. Princess Zeb-un-Nisa (Aurangzeb’s daughter) was nearly scandalized when perceived nearly unclothed in seven layers of muslin. European ladies' fashion (Marie Antoinette’s empire dresses, Regency gowns) was shaped by muslin's sheer aesthetic. In Bengali folklore, muslin’s mystical qualities appear in poetry and songs (10th-century Charyapada mention the loom, the cloth in creation myths). After death, the finest weavings were reputedly used to shroud royalty. Historical accounts and some studies indicate that fine cotton muslin from Dhaka was used to wrap royal Egyptian mummies. This luxury, hand-woven textile was imported to Egypt thousands of years ago, with some accounts suggesting its use as far back as 2,000 to 3,000 BC.

== Decline and collapse ==
The downfall of Dhaka muslin began in the late 18th century with British colonial dominance. After 1757 the East India Company imposed policies that undermined Bengal's handlooms. High tariffs were placed on Bengal textiles entering England, while cheap Lancashire cottons were flooded into Bengal markets. The result was catastrophic: local weavers suddenly lost customers and income. Chronic famines in 1770 and early 19th century (aggravated by colonial revenue demands) caused widespread starvation; many weavers starved or abandoned their craft. Lands once lush with phuti cotton became fallow; by the mid-19th century phuti karpas had virtually vanished.

As German historian Annemarie Schimmel noted, "colonialism's maxim gun outpaced the craftsmen's nimble looms." By 1800 British observers already declared Dhakai muslin extinct; only coarse jamdani and coarse calicos survived. Anecdotes of brutality (cutting thumbs, forcibly closing looms) circulated, but the real causes were economic: mechanized production, punitive duties, and neglect of rural artisans. By the early 20th century the industry had all but disappeared.

== Revival efforts and surviving legacy ==
In recent decades, Bangladesh has sought to resurrect this heritage. In 2014 Prime Minister Sheikh Hasina launched a "Muslin Revival" project. Botanists rediscovered cotton plants resembling phuti karpas in Kapasia (Gazipur), and grassroots weavers are experimenting with hand-spinning these fibers. Cultural institutions have mounted exhibitions (e.g. Bangladesh National Museum’s “Muslin Revival” show) attracting thousands.

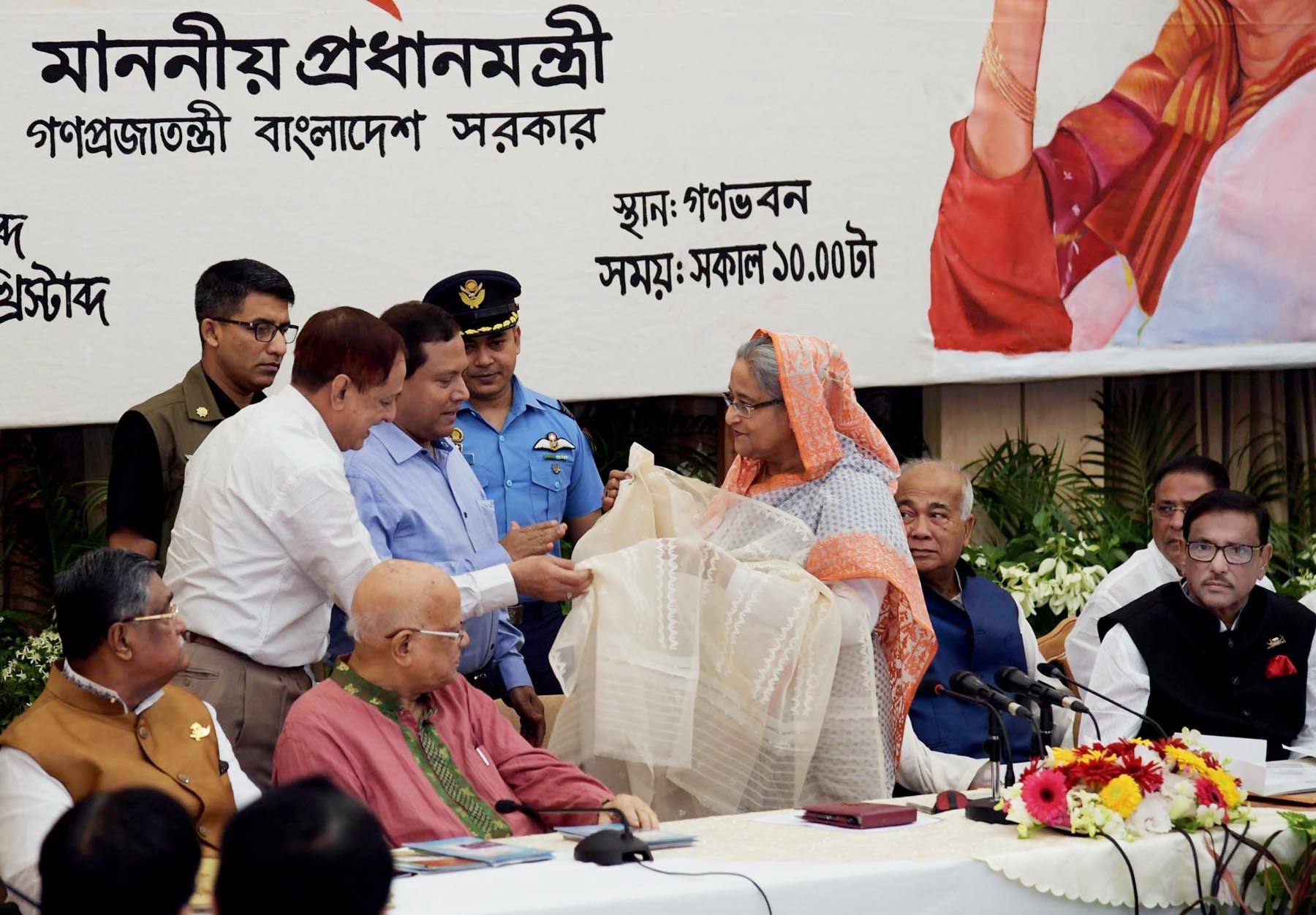
Sheikh Hasina presented Muslin saree at project inauguration ceremony in Ganabhaban

Several international recognitions have honored muslin's legacy: in 2020, Dhakai Muslin received a Geographical Indication tag in Bangladesh. UNESCO inscribed Dhakai jamdani (a patterned muslin) as Intangible Cultural Heritage in 2013. Museums hold priceless pieces: the V&A (London) alone has over 100 Dhaka muslin textiles, and private collections preserve samples once worn by Mughal courts or European aristocrats. (One famous example: a muslin shawl belonged to Jane Austen's family.) Textile conservators warn that genuine Dhaka muslin garments are extremely delicate; surviving samples must be handled with care. Today, surviving artisans and NGOs continue to document techniques and create replicas, but the craft remains rare. Their efforts serve as a "glimmer of hope" that one day this "woven wind" may return to the looms of Dhaka.
