= Devil Daggers =

2016 video game

- Developer: Sorath
- Publisher: Sorath
- Platforms: Windows, OS X, Linux
- Release: Windows; 18 February 2016; OS X; 6 July 2016; Linux; 19 September 2016
- Genre: First-person shooter
- Mode: Single-player

Devil Daggers is a first-person shooter video game developed and published by indie development team Sorath. Players are tasked with surviving for as long as possible against swarms of demonic enemies on an arena shrouded in darkness. The player character can fire daggers from their fingers to eliminate foes and move about to avoid contact with them. The player dies upon touching an enemy, and as time passes, more threatening creatures begin to appear. Survival times are recorded on a global leaderboard where replays of playthroughs can be accessed and viewed. The deliberate use of unfiltered textures and effects like polygon jitter and texture warping make its visual style reminiscent of early 3D games released in the 1990s.

Devil Daggers was released for Windows in February 2016, after being greenlit for release on digital distribution platform Steam. OS X and Linux versions were released in July and September 2016 respectively. The game received positive reviews and was praised for its sound design, unique visual style and challenging gameplay. However, some reviewers noted that during its latter stages the overwhelming number of enemies and visual style made it difficult to understand what was happening. Critics likened the aesthetics, movement and shooting mechanics of Devil Daggers to Doom, Quake and other first-person shooters of the 1990s.

== Gameplay ==
The player character is looking at a set of approaching enemies. Daggers are fired from the fingers of their outstretched hand.

Devil Daggers is a shooter video game with gameplay experienced from a first-person perspective. The goal of the game is to kill demonic enemies and survive for as long as possible. Devil Daggers opens with the player character standing in a shadowy room; in front of them is a floating dagger illuminated by a spotlight. Upon retrieving the dagger, the player is transported to a flat, floating platform arena cloaked in darkness. In the arena, demonic enemies begin spawning. Initially, a series of tentacled, towering creatures spawn and start releasing swarms of flying skulls that pursue the player. As time progresses, more exotic creatures that pose a greater threat and exhibit different behaviour begin to appear. Each enemy makes a unique and continuous noise, so that the player is able to recognise what type of enemy is approaching them.

The player kills enemies by firing daggers from their fingers. There are two firing options: clicking the left-mouse button fires a shotgun-like blast of daggers with a wide spread, and holding the mouse button down fires a precise, continuous stream of daggers. Some enemies have weak spots indicated by red crystals on their bodies. Once dead, the red crystals are dropped and can be gathered by the player to obtain attack upgrades, such as increased damage and homing daggers. The player dies when coming into physical contact with an enemy or falling off the stage. At the top of the screen, a timer displays how long the playthrough has lasted. The player's best survival time is published on a global leaderboard. Accessed via the leaderboard, replays of playthroughs can be downloaded and watched from either a first-person view or a top-down perspective.

As enemies accumulate in the arena, the amount of safe space decreases. This, alongside the enemies' aggressive behaviour, encourages constant player movement and spatial awareness. The player character can move at high speed and jump to perform evasive maneuvers. The game employs advanced movement techniques to increase player speed and jump height. The player can gain a speed boost by strafing while jumping. The shotgun-like blast can supplement the jumping mechanism; the player can be propelled further and perform a double jump by firing downwards while still in the air.

== Development and release ==
Devil Daggers was developed by Sorath, a Melbourne-based independent video game developer. The development group was formed by Matt Bush, a member of Dustforce creators Hitbox Team. The game's art direction and rendering engine were designed to reimagine the aesthetics and graphical style of video games from the 1990s. This was achieved by making use of unfiltered textures, jagged 3D models, and the deliberate implementation of polygon jitter and texture warping found in early 3D games. Jitter and warping were often considered technical flaws of PlayStation games; however, the recreation of these effects in Devil Daggers is to make enemies shudder and ripple during movement. Enemy designs are hellish, with some entities taking the form of insectoids with skeletal features. Audio is composed largely of distorted and abstract sounds with compressed, digitised screams used to produce unsettling noises for the creatures.

Sorath submitted Devil Daggers to Steam Greenlight, a community selection system, so that the game could be released on digital distribution platform Steam. The game was successfully greenlit and released for Windows on 18 February 2016. On 6 July 2016, Sorath released an OS X version of Devil Daggers. Alongside this release, two new enemy types were added to the game and the Devil Daggers soundtrack was added to the game's directory. Support for vertical sync, increased field of view, and virtual surround sound via HRTF-processing were also added. On 19 September 2016, a Linux version of Devil Daggers was released along with the ability to view replays from a top-down perspective. The update also added more statistics such as tracking a player's total survival time across all runs.

== Reception ==
Reception

Aggregate score
Aggregator	Score
Metacritic	83/100

Review scores
Publication	Score
Destructoid	10/10
Edge	8/10
Eurogamer	Recommended
GameSpot	8/10
IGN	8.5/10
Hardcore Gamer	4/5
Kill Screen	72/100
Rock, Paper, Shotgun	Recommended

Devil Daggers received "generally favourable" reviews from critics according to review aggregator website Metacritic. Critics compared the gameplay and graphics favourably to first-person shooters of the 1990s such as Doom and Quake. Reviewers were pleased with how Devil Daggers offered a stripped-down experience of these games, and provided a fast and pure gameplay experience.

The game's fluid movement system was compared to arena shooters Quake III Arena and Unreal Tournament 2004 by Edge magazine. They welcomed the inclusion of advanced movement techniques, saying they felt "fresh" when implemented in a survival context. They also thought that Devil Daggers refined on so much of the borrowed elements, that it would be inaccurate to simply call the game a "nostalgic throwback". Devil Daggers was considered to be a perfect distillation of old school arena shooters by Zack Furniss, writing for Destructoid. Kill Screen writer Davis Cox praised the "frenetic, bullet hell" nature of Devil Daggers, but felt that there was opportunity to incorporate more interesting levels and spaces into the game.

Tom Senior of PC Gamer enjoyed the "oppressive" and "hellish" atmosphere created by the deliberate use of old rendering techniques and effects. Both GameSpot and IGN critics agreed that although the retro visual style was fitting, it could also become a hindrance when the excessive clutter of pixelated enemies made it difficult to interpret what was happening on screen. Furniss of Destructoid stated that the visuals might not appeal to everyone, but he loved the horror aspect and sense of nostalgia that it evoked.

The game's sound design was lauded by critics. Reviewers especially liked the practical use of unique and continuous enemy noises. Being able to pinpoint an enemy's location when they were obscured from view was seen as an interesting aspect of the game's audio. The cacophony created by enemies was described as "chilling" by IGN reviewer Chloi Rad. She also felt that the audio combined well with the fluid movement to provide the player with the information and means for dealing with enemies.

Many reviewers discussed the high level of difficulty presented by Devil Daggers, calling the experience "intense" and "brutal", but also "gleeful" and "exhilarating". Edge called the game an "expertly designed test of skill". GameSpot reviewer Mike Mahardy believed that surpassing the 60 second mark in a run was a feat. Eurogamer writer Johnny Chiodini thought the game excelled at being a short experience and highlighted that becoming proficient in Devil Daggers was a process of repetition and refinement. Writing for Hardcore Gamer, Mark Steighner called the game addictive and thought that it was ideal for people obsessed with chasing high scores in games. Critics also liked the replay feature and pointed out that it was a great way to learn from other players and heighten the competitive aspect among the community.

Rock, Paper, Shotgun named Devil Daggers as the best game of 2016. Writers of the website complimented its gameplay, aesthetic, and sound design. In January 2017, they placed Devil Daggers fifth on their list of the fifty best first-person shooters on PC. Chris Thursten of PC Gamer named Devil Daggers as his personal game of the year, calling it "flawlessly designed".
