= Lakhnauti (disambiguation) =

Lakhnauti, also known as Gauḍa, is an ancient ruined city in West Bengal, India.

Lakhnauti may refer to:

- Lakhnauti Turk, a village in Uttar Pradesh, India
- Lakhnauti, a Bengal kingdom ruled by Shamsuddin Firoz Shah and then Ghiyasuddin Bahadur Shah, named after Lakhnauti of Gaur
- Lucknow, of which the original name was Lakhnauti (of Awadh), then Lakhnau (now spelled Lucknow)

== See also ==
- Lucknow (disambiguation)
