= Khokhari River =

River in Uttar Pradesh, India

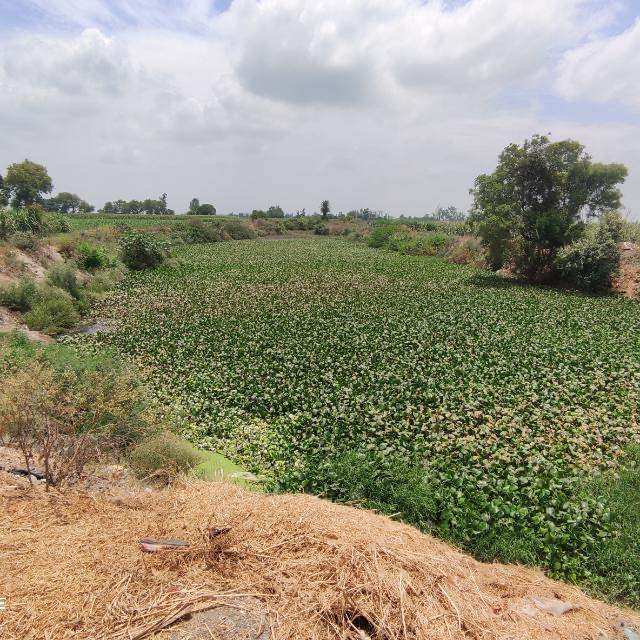
Khokhari river basin in Shamli district.

The Khokhari River is a rain-fed tributary of the Yamuna River located in Uttar Pradesh, India. It originates in the Saharanpur district and flows through several villages of Saharanpur and Shamli districts of Uttar Pradesh before merging into the Yamuna at Khwajpura village of Shamli district.

== Environmental Issues ==
The river is currently dying and the riverbed is dried-up with solid waste dumped in it. In addition, the riverbed has been encroached in villages such as in Lakhnauti, Chausana and Kertu.

== Revival Efforts ==
There have been multiple revival efforts in the past by the Drainage Department of the Government of Uttar Pradesh. The revival efforts have failed a few times in the past.

In March 2024, a petition was filed before the National Green Tribunal for the revival of the Khokhari River. The National Green Tribunal have tasked the District Magistrate of Shamli and Saharanpur districts along with the Uttar Pradesh Pollution Control Board to come up with a restoration plan for the river. The different departments are currently working for the restoration of the Khokhari River.
