= Mughal Tahakhana =

Mughal basement palace in Bangladesh

- মোঘল তাহখানা
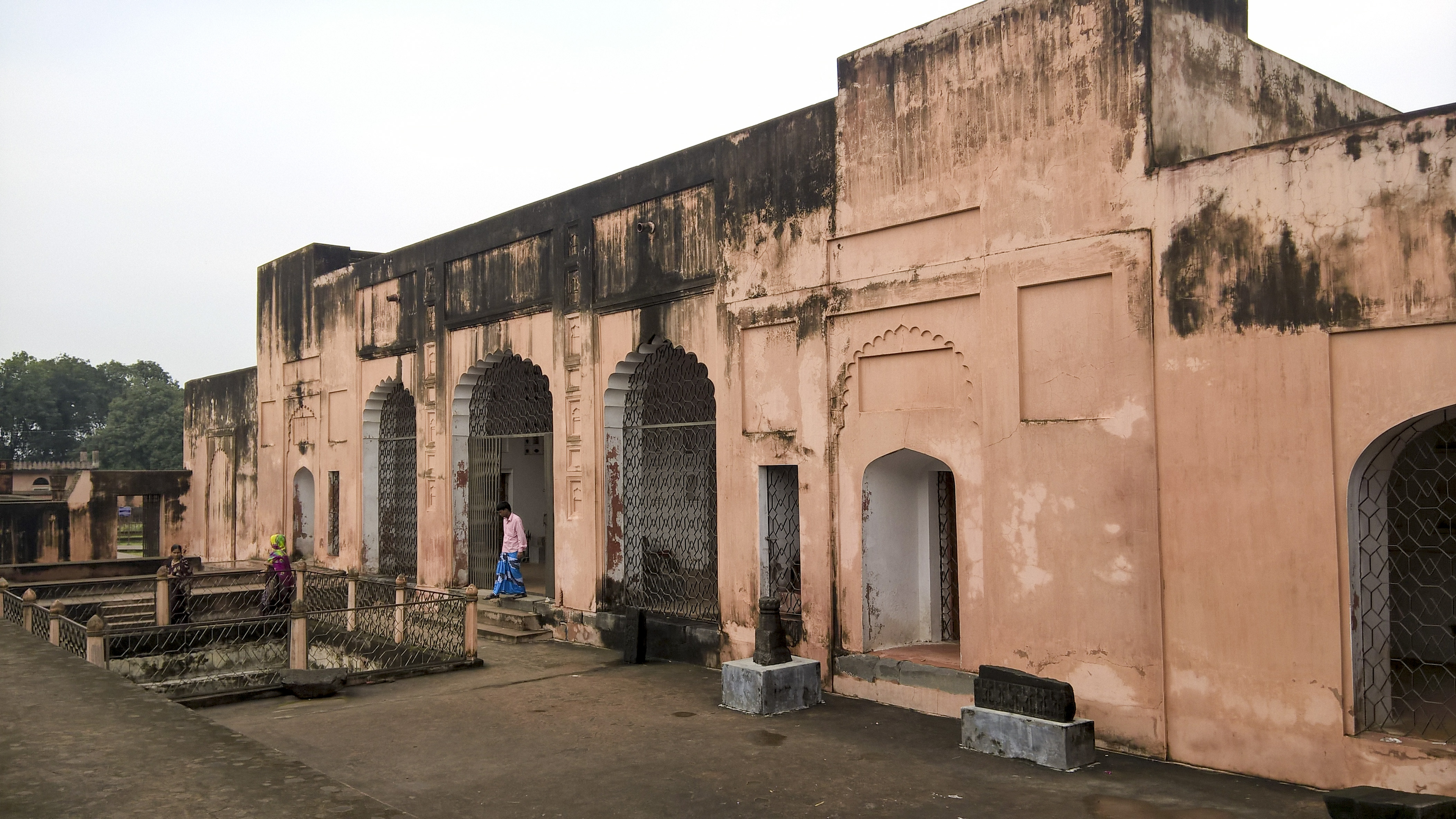
- Front view of Mughal Tahakhana
- Interactive map of the Mughal Tahakhana area

General information
- Architectural style: Gauḍa
- Location: Choto Sona Mosque, Shibganj Upazila, Chapai Nawabganj District, Rajshahi, Bangladesh
- Coordinates: 24.8177°N 88.1373°E
- Owner: Department of Archaeology, Bangladesh

Technical details
- Floor count: 1

Design and construction
- Known for: Palace of Shah Shuja

Other information
- Number of rooms: 1

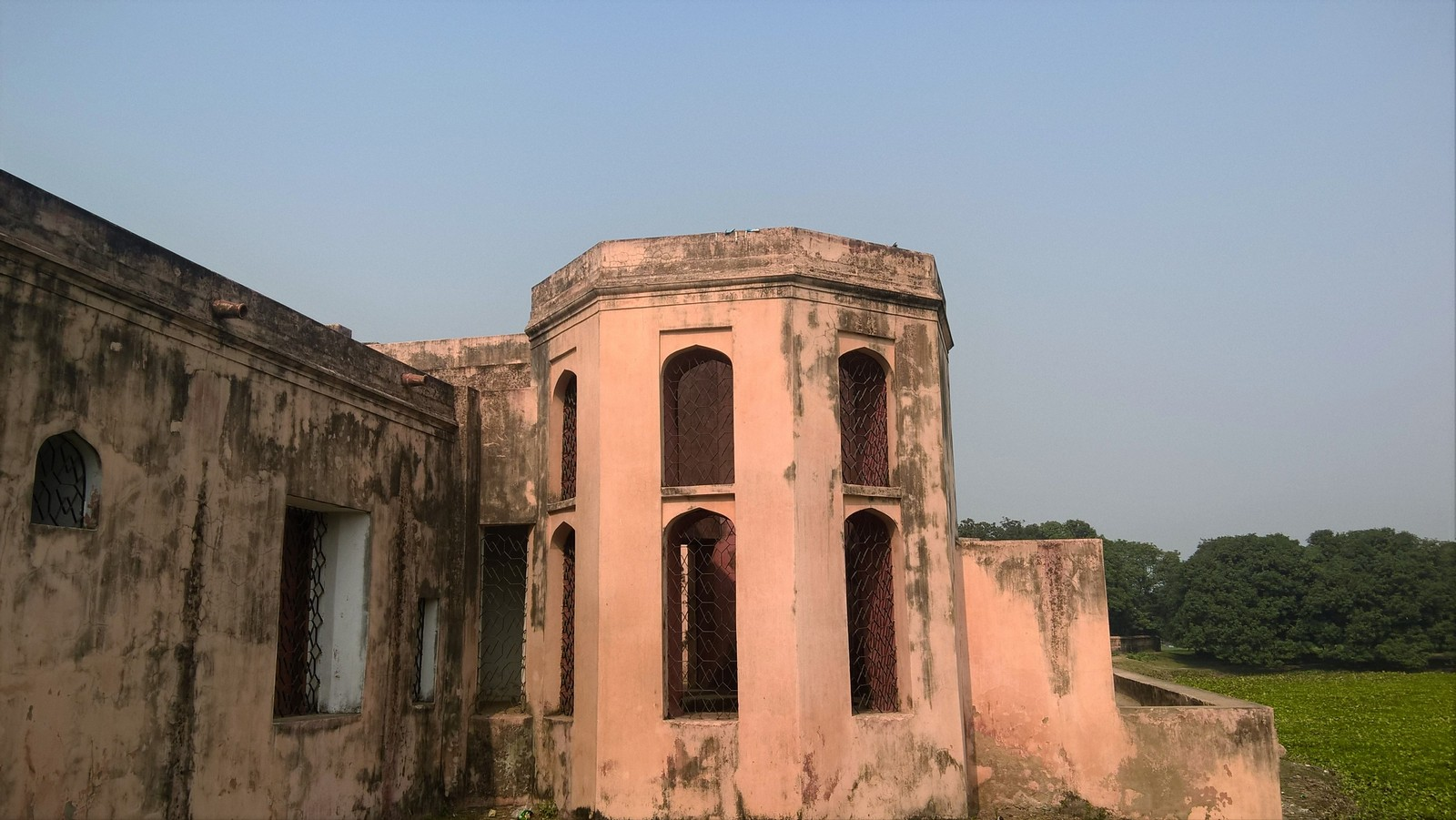
Tahakhana complex

Mughal Tahakhana or Shah Shuja Tahakhana is a three storied building known as Tahakhana (Bengali: তাহখানা, Persian: ته خانه, meaning cold building or palace.) The historical Tahakhana is located at the Gauḍa (region) in Firozpur area in the west of a big pond. It is 15 km from Chapai Nawabganj District in Shahbajpur Union at Shibganj Upazila.

== History ==
The Subahdar of Bengal, Shah Shuja founded this palace as a 'temperature-control unit' in honour of his Murshed Shah Syed Niyamatullah, mainly for comfort in winter. A son of Mughal Emperor Shah Jahan, Shah Shuja founded this palace between 1619 and 1658 (or 1639–1660). There is a saying that when he came to meet with his Murshed, he used the middle wider room. A number of unmarked graves inside the 'Tahakhana Complex' are considered the final resting place of companions or Khadems of Shah Syed Niyamatullah.

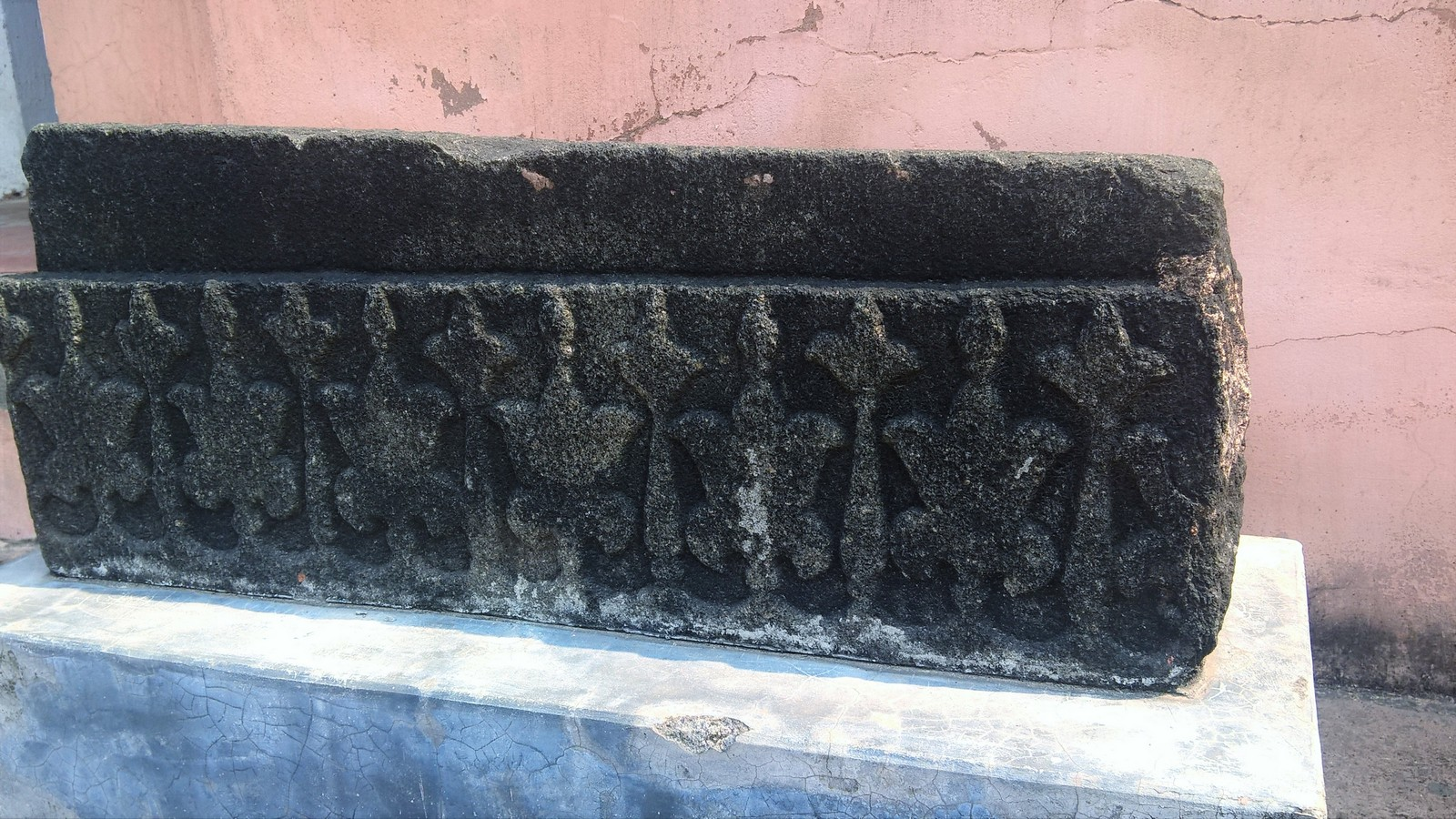
Tahakhana carved artistry

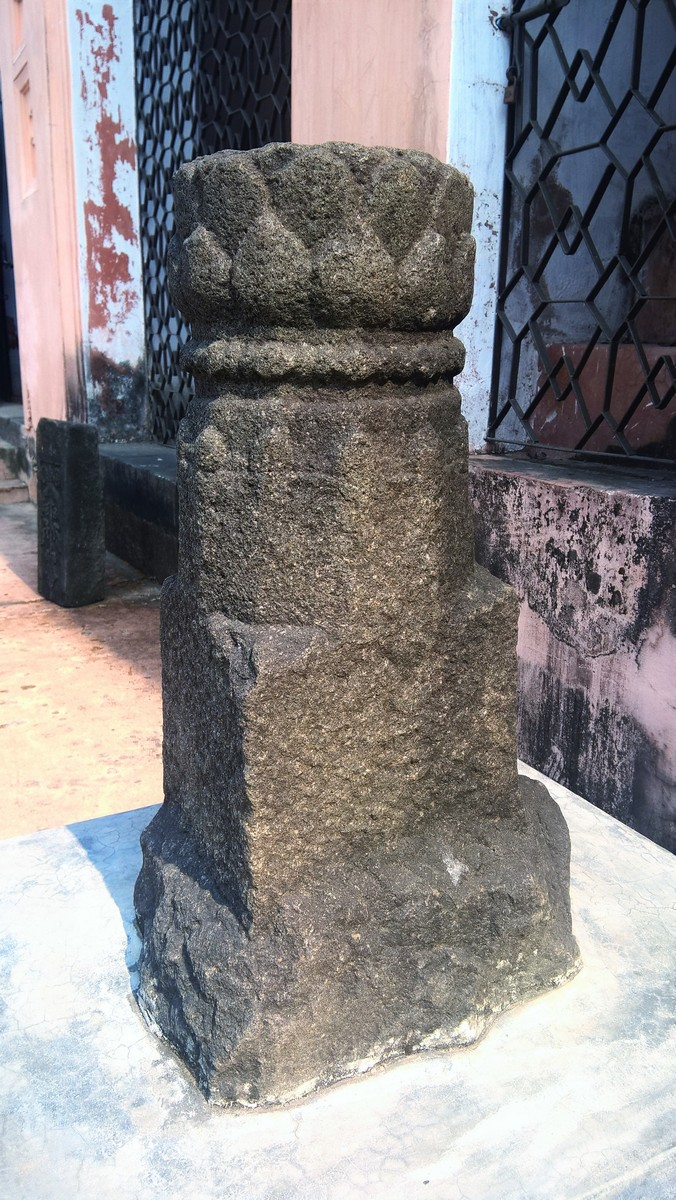
Tahakhana's ancient column

== Structure ==
Ancient architecture like Gauḍa is rarely found except Tahakhana. Her ceiling and partition are coagulated on the beam by concrete casting. The Mosque and Tahakhana are on the lake name 'Dafe-ul-Balah'. Two stare cases are sank into the lake. Two more structures are on the north west side of the palace, nearer one is a three domed mosque and another one is one domed tomb with bolted veranda. All the buildings are founded by the same time for a specific purpose and considered as a complex unit. Main materiel of the building is brick. Black stone is used for the threshold and wooden vim used for plain roof. The building seems to be single storied from the west side but assumed double storied from the east side, extended by the rooms directly raised the archway from the lake. A hammam is in the west of the building supplied water from an octagonal reservoir. A small family mosque is in the north and at its back side an open room which connected with an octagonal tower. This tower possibly used for contemplation. This octagonal tower balanced the complex. The palace is plastered and engraved by the crafts following Mughal architecture.

== Gallery ==
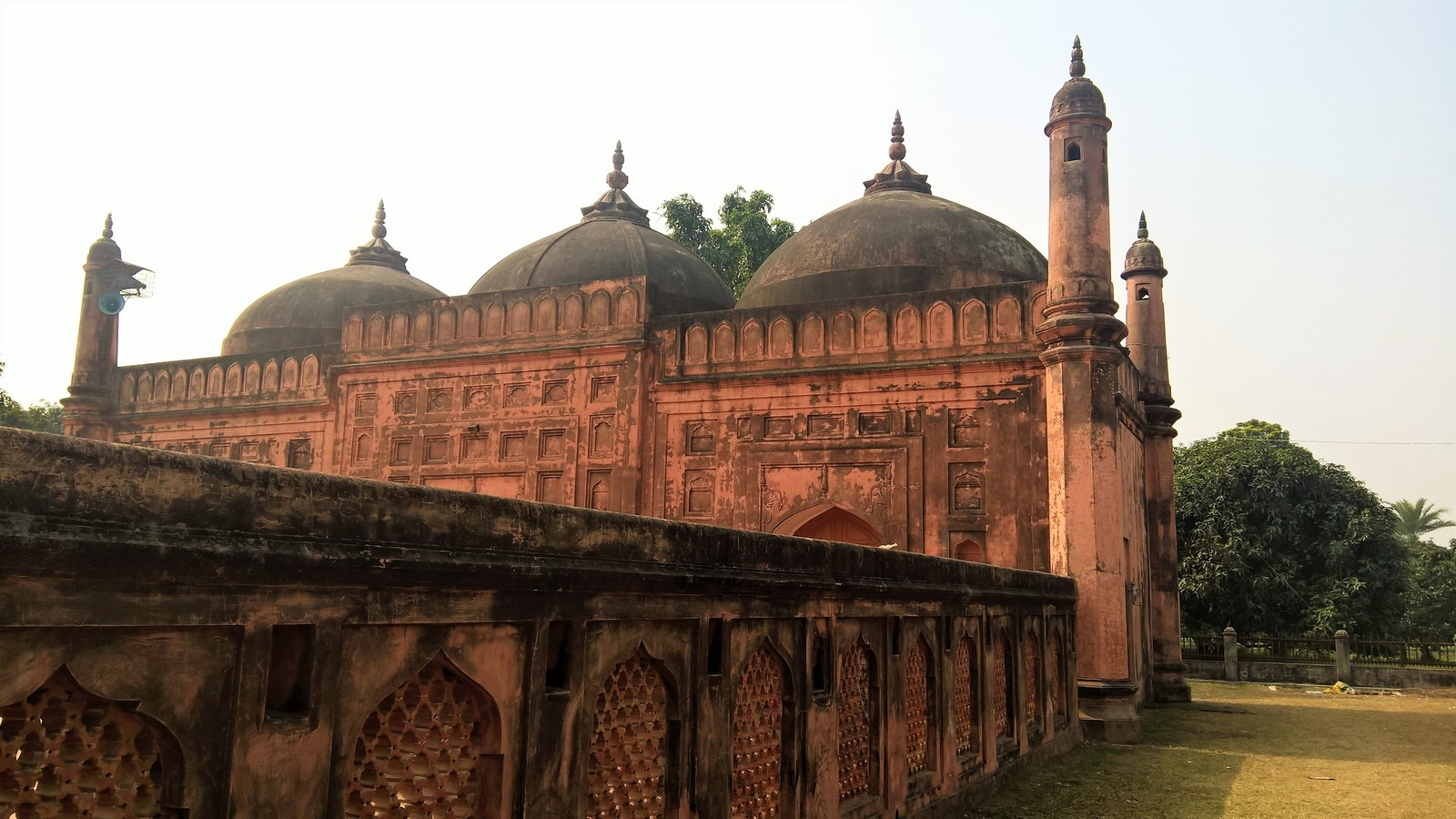
Three domed Shah Syed Niyamatullah Mosque

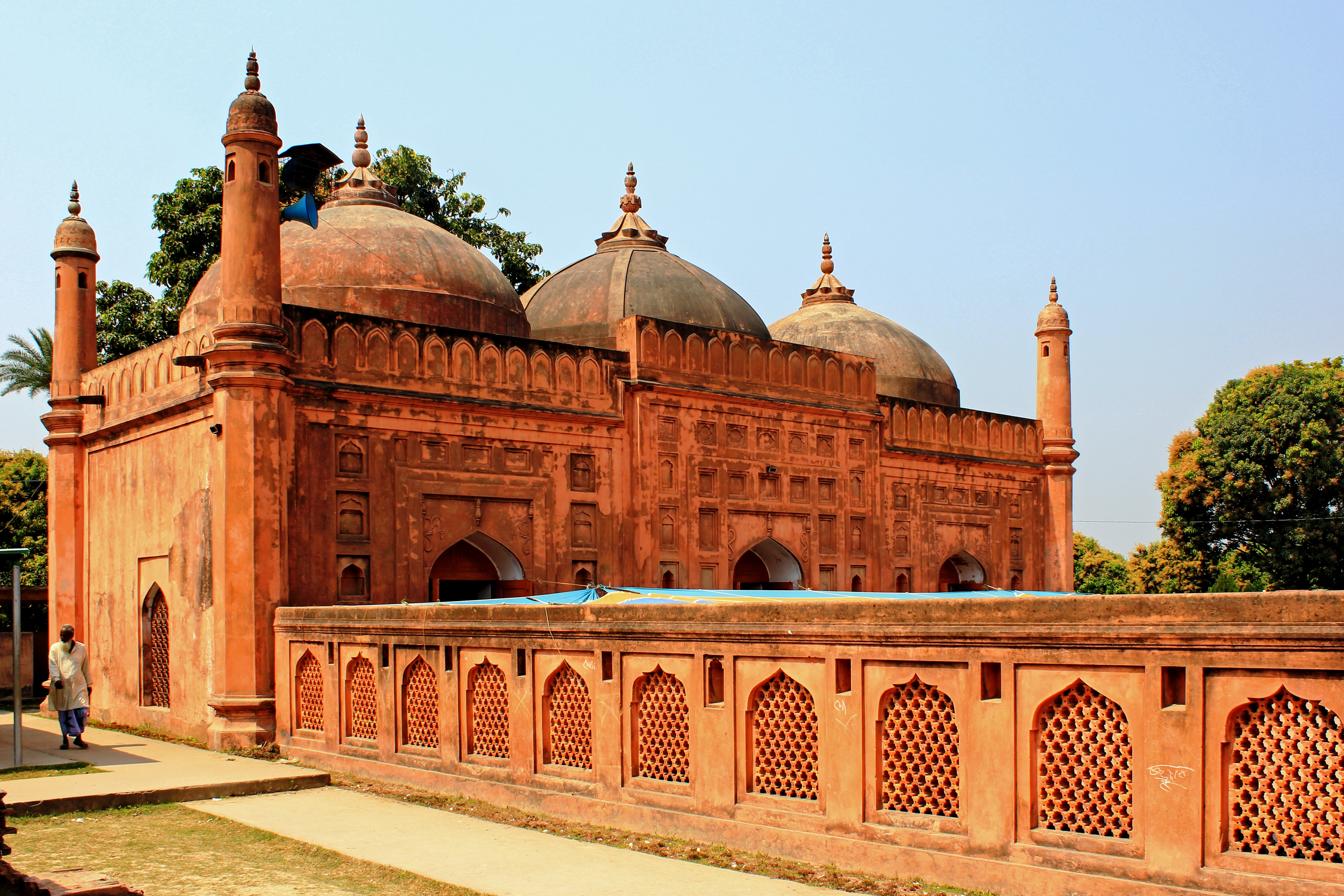
Three domed Shah Syed Niyamatullah Mosque

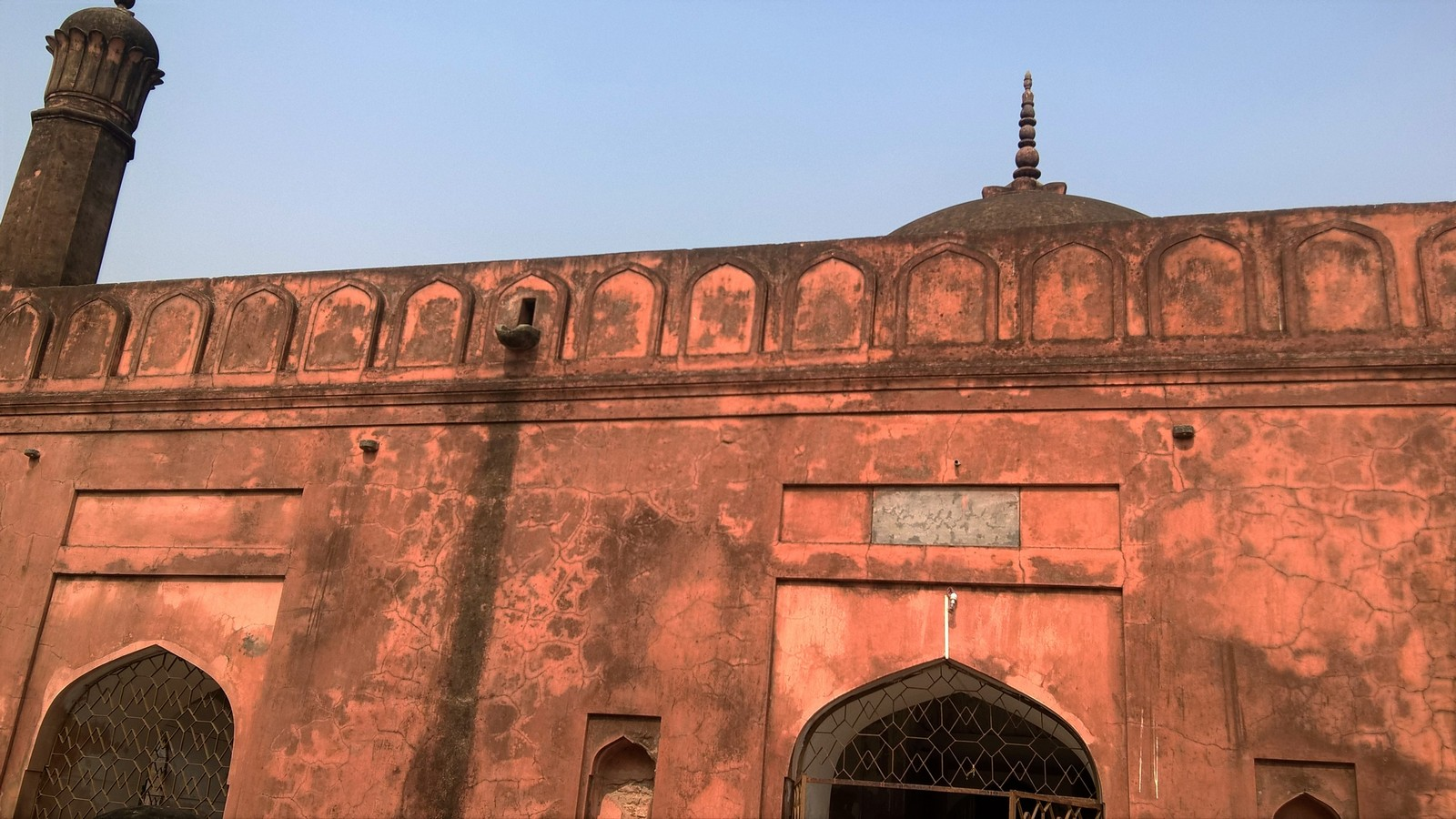
Shah Syed Niyamatullah Grave

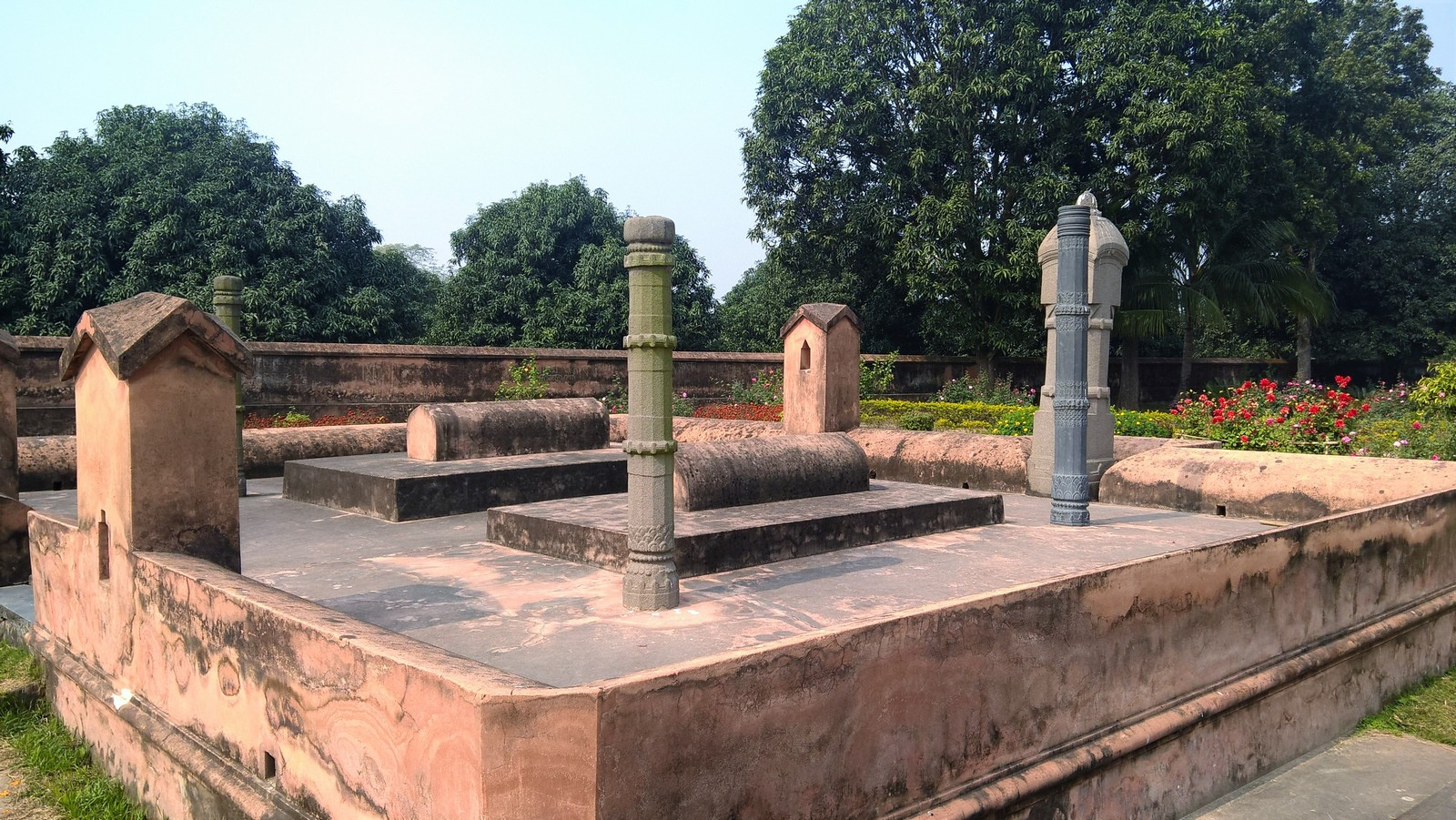
Unknown graves besides Shah Syed Niyamatullah Grave

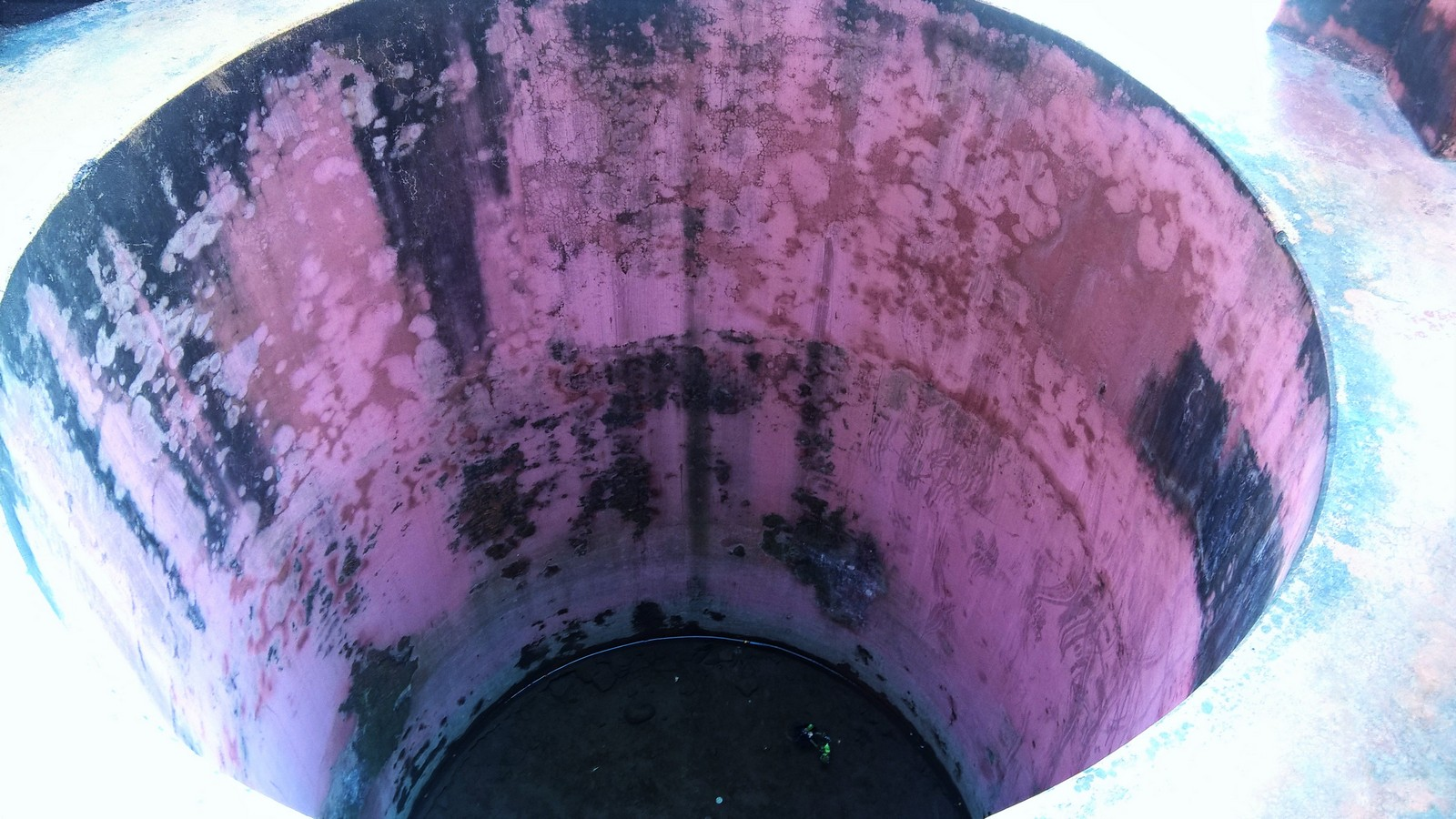
Well inside Tahakhana

== See also ==
- List of archaeological sites in Bangladesh
- List of mosques in Bangladesh
