= Gauḍa (city) =

Ancient city in India and Bangladesh

- Lakhnauti, Jannatabad
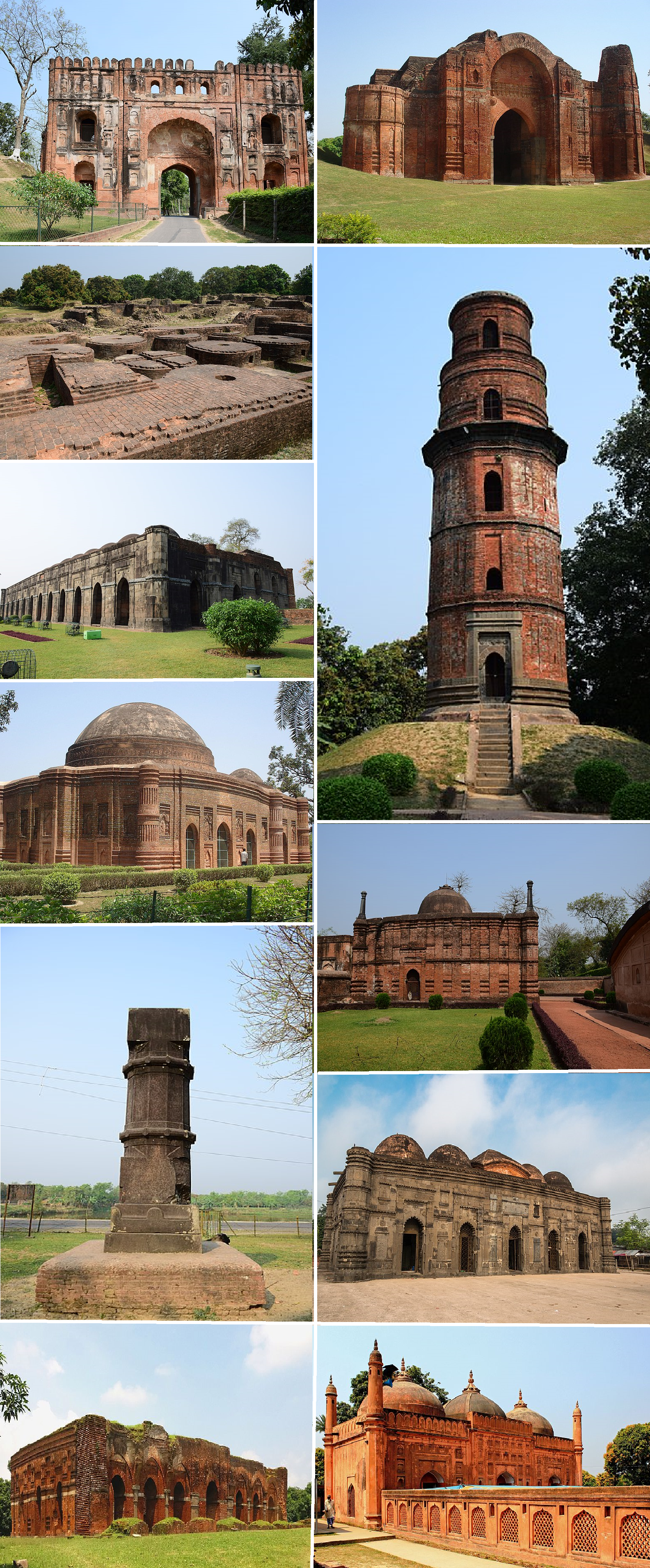
- Clockwise from top: Lukochuri Darwaza, Dakhil Darwaza, Firoz Minar, Qadam Rasul Mosque, Choto Sona Mosque, Mughal Tahakhana, Darasbari Mosque, Gauda pillar, Lattan Mosque, Baro Shona Masjid, Ballal Bati

- Location of Gauḍa in West Bengal, India Location of Gauḍa in India Location of Gauḍa in Bangladesh Gauḍa (city) (Bangladesh)
- 24°52′0″N 88°8′0″E
- Type: Settlement
- Location: Malda district, (in West Bengal, India); Chapainawabganj District, (in Bangladesh)

History
- Built: 7th century
- Abandoned: 16th century

Site notes
- Length: 7.1 km (4.4 mi)
- Width: 1–2 km (0.62–1.24 mi)

Gauḍa (also known as Gaur, Gour, Lakhnauti, Lakshmanavati and Jannatabad) is a historic city of Bengal in the eastern part of the Indian subcontinent, and one of the most prominent capitals of classical and medieval India, being the capital city of Bengal under several kingdoms. The Gauḍa region was also a province of several pan-Indian empires. During the seventh century, the Gauda Kingdom was founded by King Shashanka, whose reign corresponds with the beginning of the Bengali calendar. Gour gradually became synonymous with Bengal and Bengalis. It was conquered by Bakhtiyar Khalji, a lieutenant of the Ghurid ruler Muhammad of Ghori, in 1203.

Richard M. Eaton writes that the city had 40,000 population in 1515 AD. For a period of 112 years, between 1453 and 1565, Gauda was the capital of the Bengal Sultanate. According to other estimates, in 1500, Gauda was the fifth-most populous city in the world, with a population of 200,000, as well as one of the most densely populated cities in the Indian subcontinent. The Portuguese left detailed accounts of the city. The sultans built a citadel, many mosques, a royal palace, canals, and bridges. Buildings featured glazed tiles.

The city thrived until the collapse of the Bengal Sultanate in the 16th century, when the Mughal Empire took control of the region. When the Mughal Emperor Humayun invaded the region, he renamed the city Jannatabad ("heavenly city"). Most of the surviving structures in Gauda are from the period of the Bengal Sultanate. The city was sacked by Sher Shah Suri. An outbreak of the plague contributed to the city's downfall. The course of the Ganges was once located near the city, but a change in the river's course caused Gauda to lose its strategic importance. A new Mughal capital developed later in Rajmahal and then in Dhaka.

Gauda was one of the most prominent capitals in the history of Bengal and the history of the Indian subcontinent, and a centre of stately medieval architecture. Gauda's ruins were depicted in the artwork of European painters during the 18th and 19th centuries. Colonial officials, such as Francis Buchanan-Hamilton and William Francklin, left detailed surveys of the former Bengali capital.

== Geography ==
Cities, towns and locations in the southern portion of Malda district (including Kaliachak I, Kaliachak II, Kaliachak III, Manikchak and English Bazar CD blocks)
M: municipal town, CT: census town, R: rural/ urban centre, F: Facility, H: historical centre
Owing to space constraints in the small map, the actual locations in a larger map may vary slightly

=== Location ===
Gauḍa is located at 24°52′N 88°08′E. It straddles the Bangladesh-India border, with most of its ruins on the Indian side and a few structures on the Bangladeshi side. It was once one of the most populous cities in the world. The ruins of this former city now straddle the international border and are divided between the Malda district of West Bengal and Chapai Nawabganj District of Rajshahi Division. The Kotwali Gate, formerly part of the citadel, now marks the border checkpoint between the two countries.

== History ==
=== Kingdom of Gauda ===
After the fall of the Gupta Empire, western Bengal was ruled by the Gauda Kingdom and eastern Bengal by the Samatata Kingdom. Gauda kingdom was founded by Shashanka, one of the pioneering Bengal kings in history. Shashanka's reign falls approximately between 590 and 625.

=== Pala Empire ===
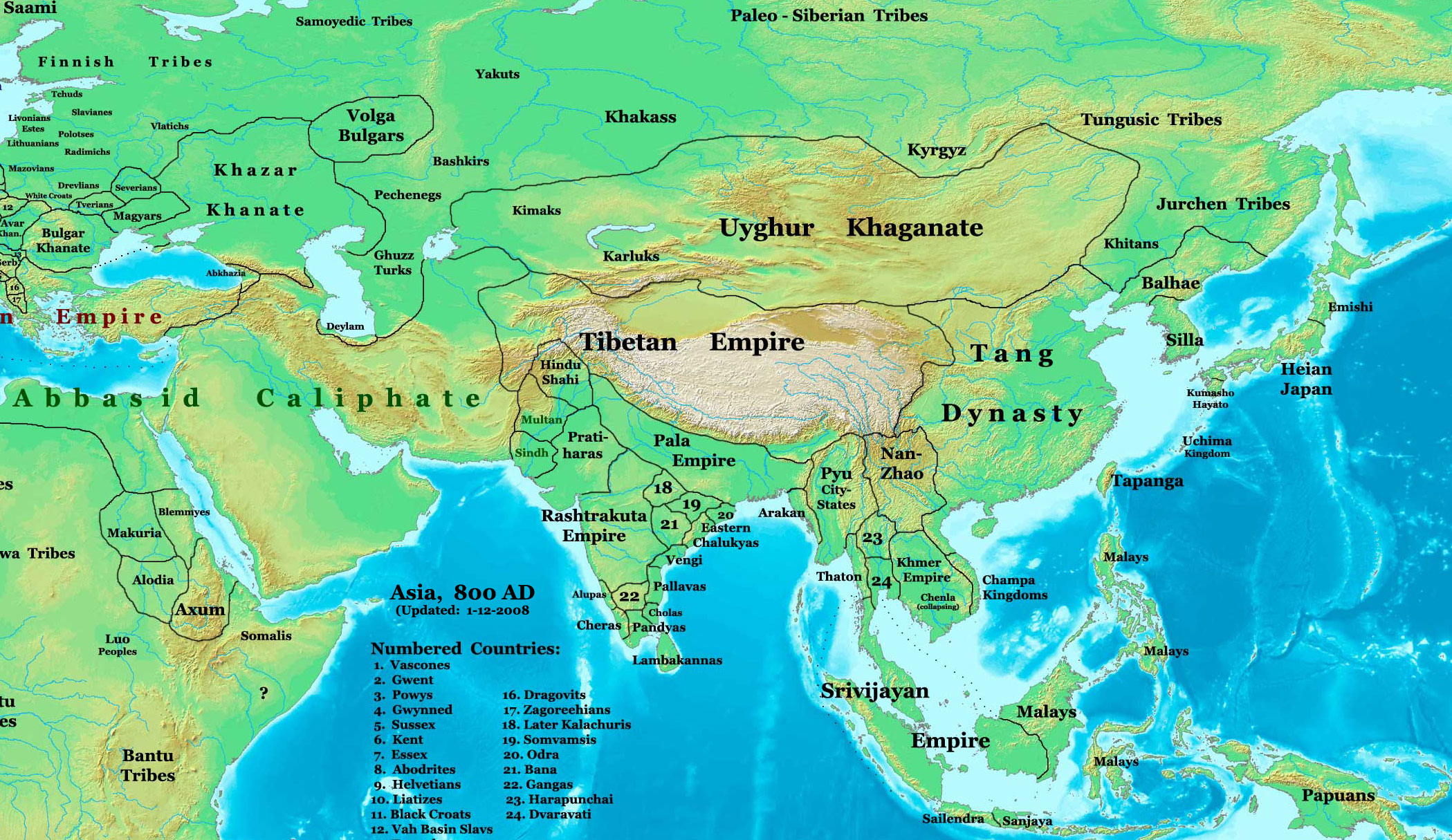
The Pala Empire

The Pala Empire was founded in the Gauda region during the rise of Gopala as king with the approval of an assembly of chieftains. The Pala emperors carried the title Lord of Gauda. The empire ruled for four centuries, and its territory included large parts of northern India. According to historian D. C. Sicar, the term Gauda is an appropriate name for the Pala Empire itself. The Pala period saw the development of the Bengali language, script, and other aspects of Bengali culture. Indeed, the term Gaudiya (of Gauda) became synonymous with Bengal and Bengalis.

=== Sena kingdom ===
Gauda became known as Lakhnauti during the Sena dynasty. The name was in honour of the Sena ruler Lakhsman Sena.

=== Sultanate period ===
==== Delhi Sultanate ====
On a campaign towards Tibet in 1206, Bakhtiyar Khalji left Shiran Khalji to govern Bengal as a substitute. Bakhtiyar would die after the failure of this expedition, officially leaving Shiran as the next governor of Lakhnauti, who would shortly be succeeded by Ali Mardan Khalji and Iwaz Khalji. The latter would declare independence from Delhi, which would also lead to his death.

==== Independent Lakhnauti ====
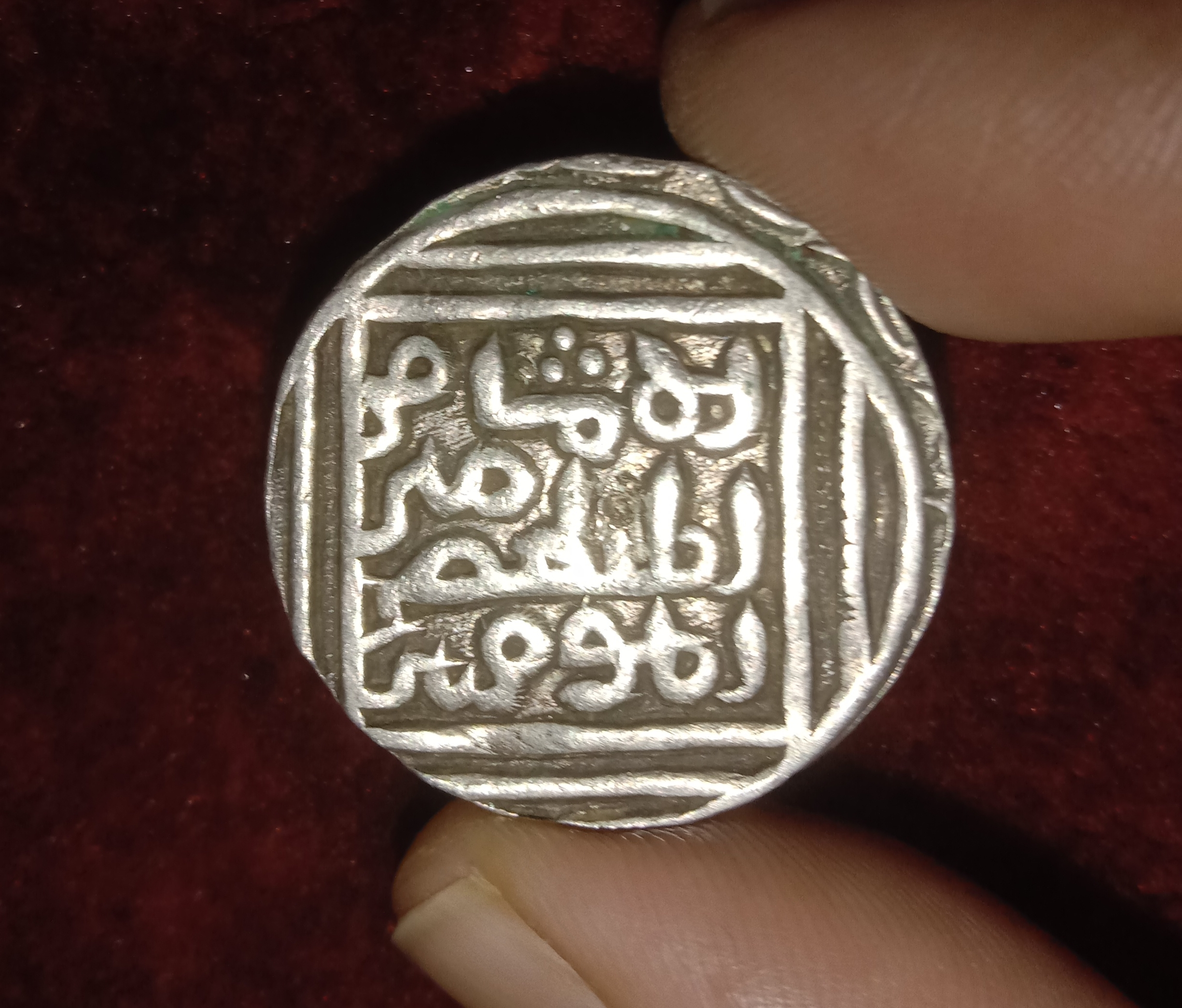
Silver Tanka of Ghiyath al-Din Bahadur Shah, independent sultan of the Kingdom of Lakhnauti, struck in Khitta Lakhnauti Mint.

In 1281, Nasiruddin Bughra Khan, the governor of Lakhnauti, declared independence from the Delhi Sultanate. He would be succeeded by his son, Rukunuddin Kaikaus, who expanded the kingdom. During his rule, the Lakhnauti-based kingdom expanded into Satgaon in the south, Bihar in the west, and Devkot in the north. His successor was Shamsuddin Firuz Shah, who played pivotal roles in completing Kaikaus' work in Satgaon before proceeding to take over Mymensingh and Sonargaon. In 1303, Firuz's nephew Sikandar Khan Ghazi and commander-in-chief Syed Nasiruddin teamed up with Shah Jalal and his forces in the Conquest of Sylhet against the Gour Kingdom. Sylhet was successfully incorporated into Firuz's Lakhnauti kingdom. His successor, Ghiyasuddin Bahadur Shah, would lose independence to the Delhi Sultanate once again.

==== Bengal Sultanate ====
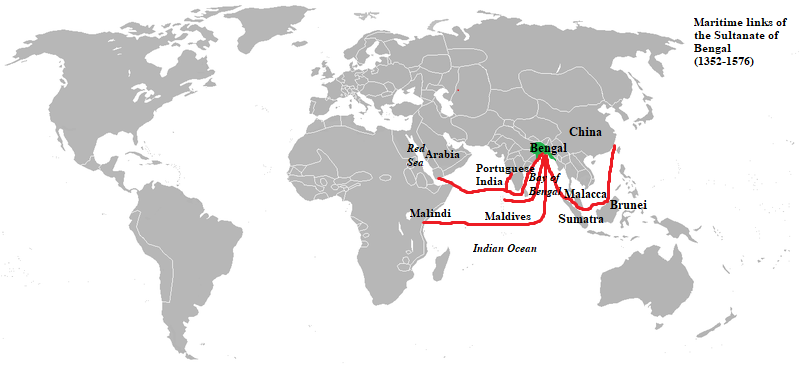
Maritime links of the Bengal Sultanate.

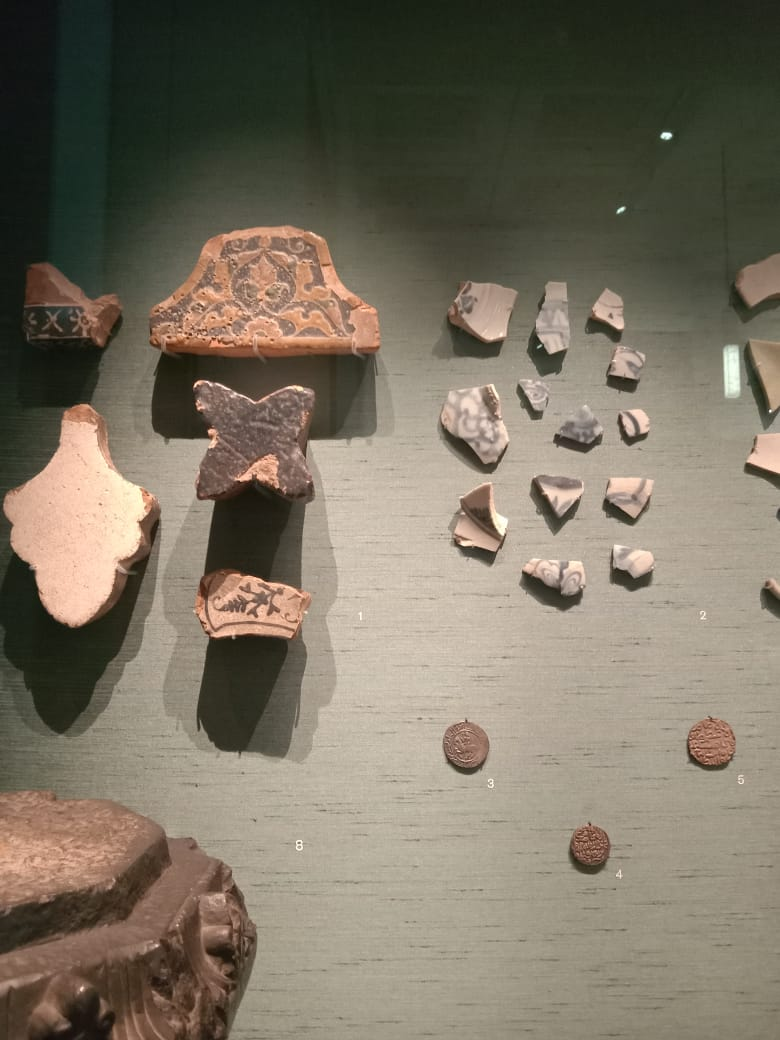
Remnants of colored tiles, Chinese porcelain, and coins from Gaur in the British Museum

Gauda was widely known as Gaur during the Bengal Sultanate. The founder of the sultanate, Shamsuddin Ilyas Shah, was Delhi's governor in Satgaon. Ilyas Shah rebelled and overthrew Gaur's governor Alauddin Ali Shah in 1342. Ilyas Shah united the Bengal region into a separate independent state from Delhi in 1352. Pandua became the first capital of the sultanate. In 1450, Sultan Mahmud Shah of Bengal announced the transfer of Bengal's capital from Pandua to Gaur. The transfer was completed by 1453. Gaur served as the Bengali sultanate's capital for over one hundred years until 1565.

Gaur was one of the most densely populated cities in the Indian subcontinent, with a population rivalling that of Fatehpur Sikri. The city had a citadel, a royal palace and durbar, many mosques, residences for aristocrats and merchants, and bazaars. Portuguese travellers left detailed and extensive accounts of Gaur. The Portuguese compared the affluence of the city with Lisbon. The royal palace was divided into three compartments. A high wall enclosed the palace. A moat surrounded the palace on three sides and was connected to the Ganges, which guarded the western side of the citadel. According to a contemporary Vaishnava poet, Sultan Alauddin Hussain Shah once saw a procession led by Sri Chaitanya on the opposite bank of the river. The first compartment in the north included the durbar. An inscription of Sultan Rukunuddin Barbak Shah mentions a fountain and water channel located halfway from the Dakhil Darwaza gate. The gate still stands today. According to the Portuguese and medieval Bengali poet Krittibas Ojha, the road from the Dakhil Darwaza to the durbar had nine well-guarded gates, of which two can still be identified today. The second compartment was the living quarters of the sultan, which was adorned with glazed tiles of various colours. The third compartment was the harem. Many artifacts have been recovered from the palace grounds, including enamelled bricks and Chinese porcelain. In 1521, a Portuguese visitor saw Sultan Nusrat Shah enjoying polo being played on the plains below the citadel. Gaur was the center of regional politics. The deposed Arakanese king Min Saw Mon was granted asylum in Gaur. The Sultan of Bengal dispatched a military expedition from Gaur to achieve the Reconquest of Arakan, which were led by commander Paragal Khan and his son Chhuti Khan with prince Abdul Samad Zakir Shah.

The Portuguese historian Castenhada de Lopez described the houses of Gaur. Most buildings were one-storeyed with ornamental floor tiles, courtyards, and gardens. There were canals and bridges. Bengal attracted many Eurasian merchants during the Sultanate period, and Gaur was a centre of the trade like other erstwhile Bengali cities, including Pandua, Chittagong, Sonargaon, and Satgaon. Bengal also attracted immigrants from North India, the Middle East, and Central Asia.

In the 16th century, Gaur was occupied by the Mughal emperor Humayun, who sought to name it as Jannatabad (heavenly city). The city was looted and plundered during Sher Shah Suri's invasion. After 1565, Sultan Sulaiman Khan Karrani shifted the capital to Tandah. In 1575, Gaur was conquered by a Mughal contingent led by Munim Khan. The Bengal Sultanate ended during the Battle of Rajmahal in 1576.

Structures and ruins of the Bengal Sultanate

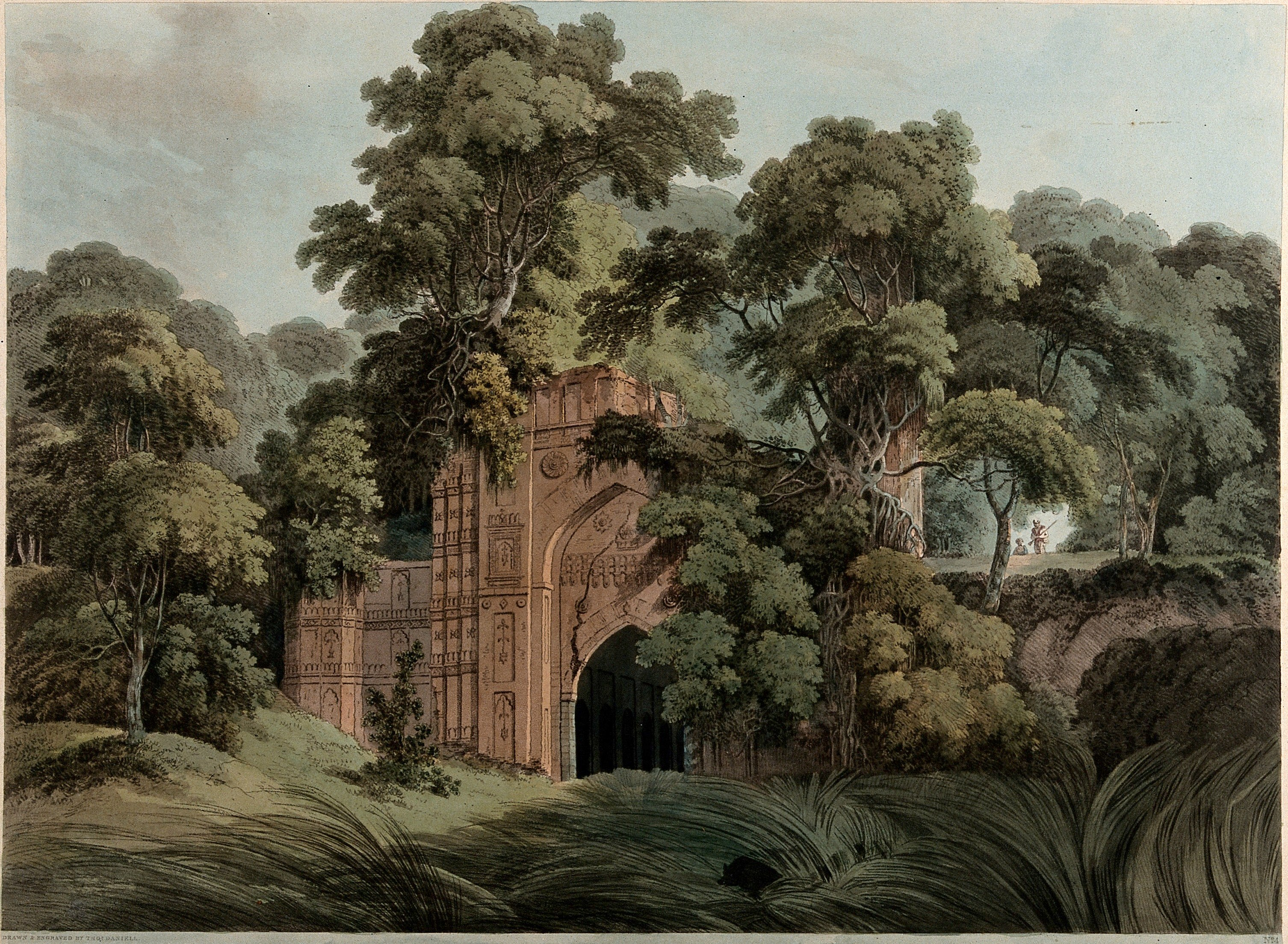
Ruins at the ancient city of Gour, 1795

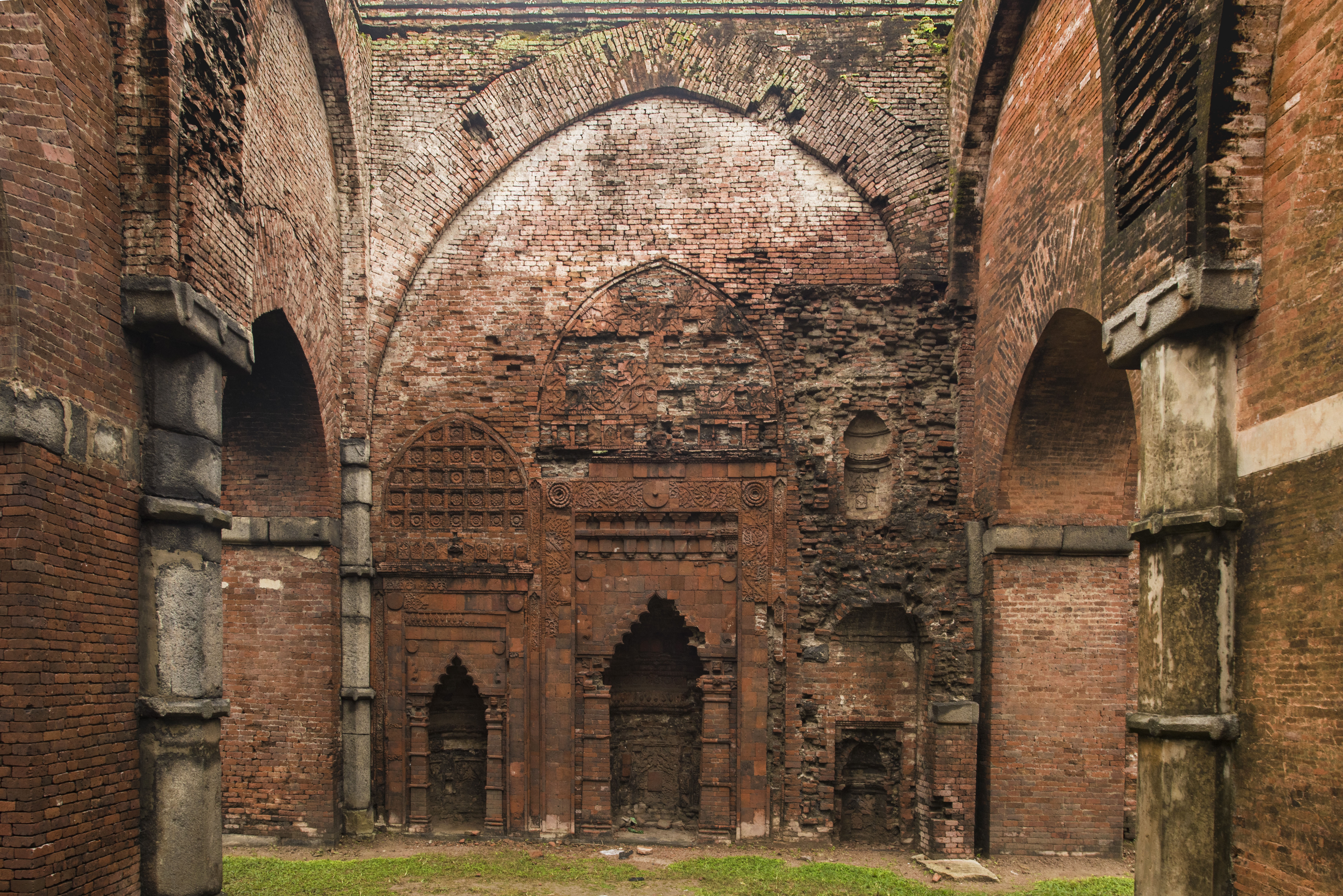
Interior of Darasbari Mosque

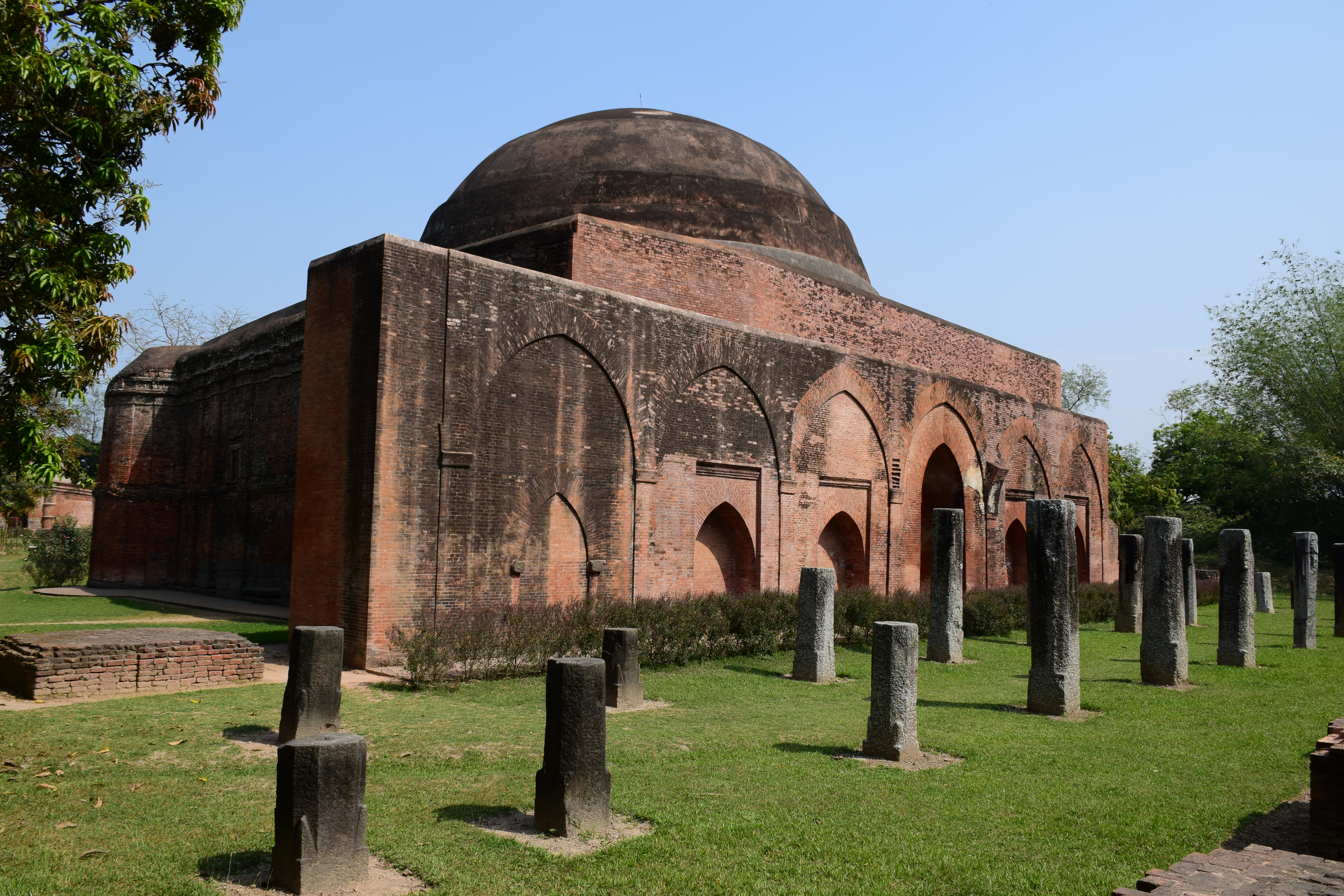
Chamkan Mosque

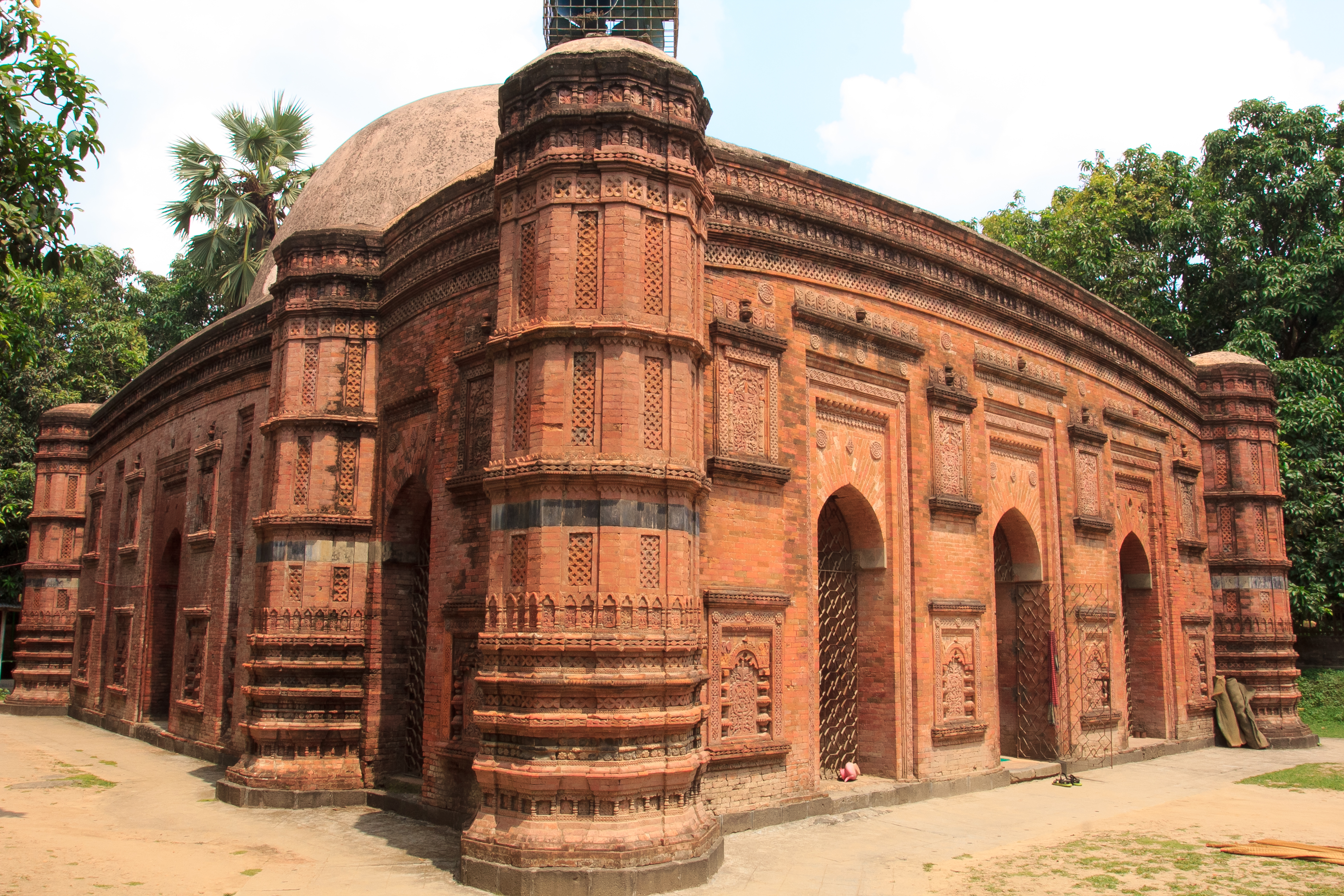
Khania Dighi Mosque

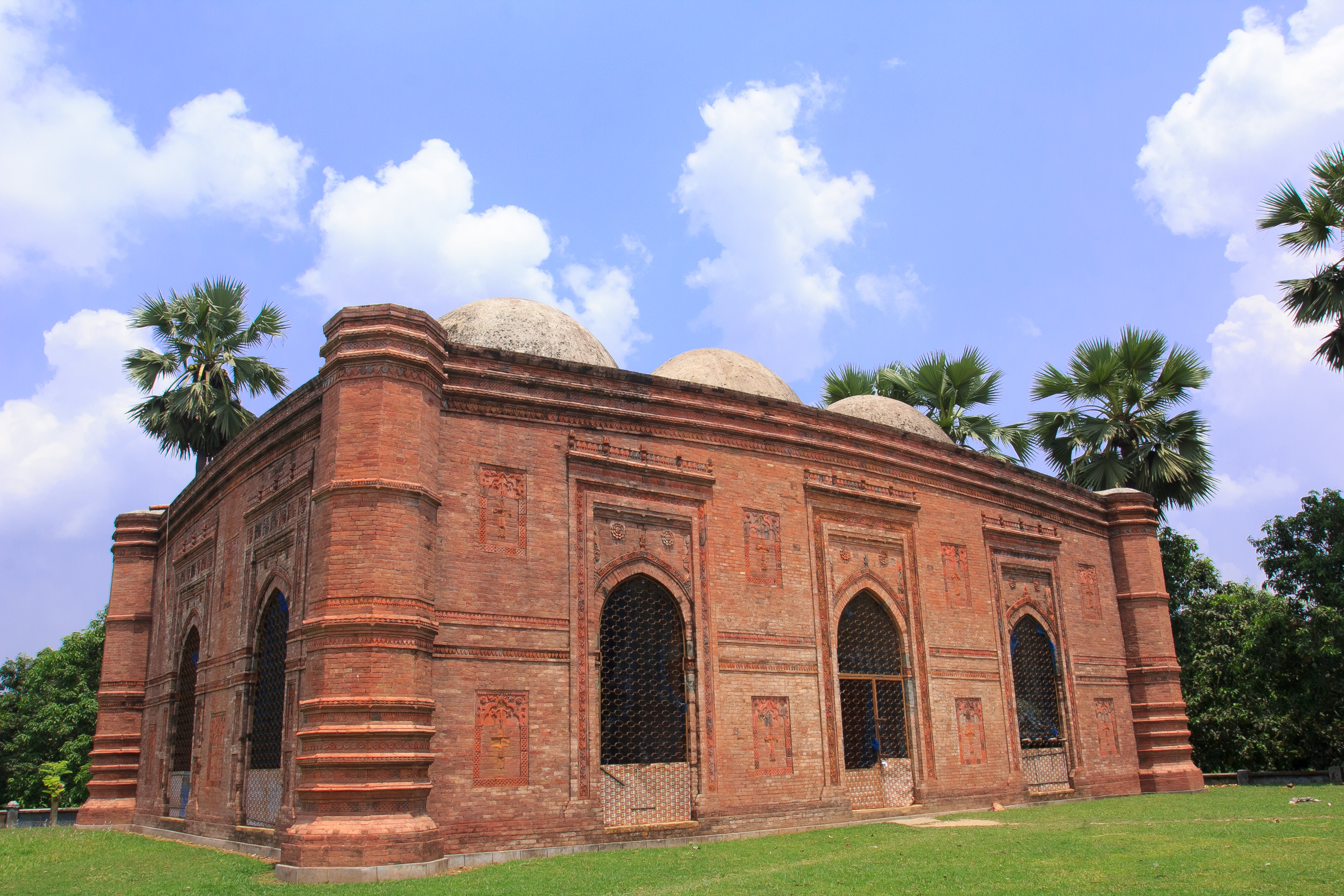
Dhania Chalk Mosque

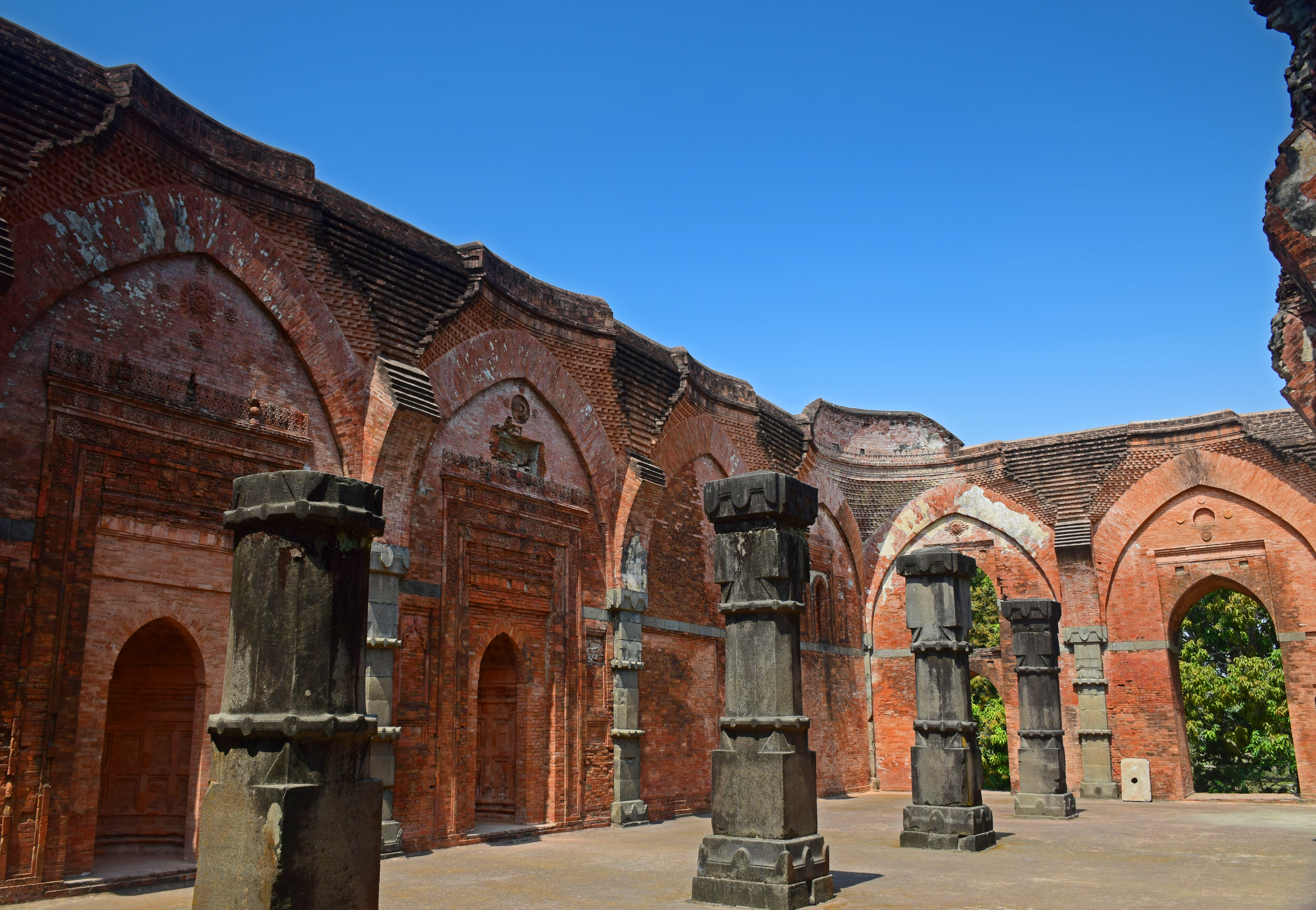
Tantipara Mosque

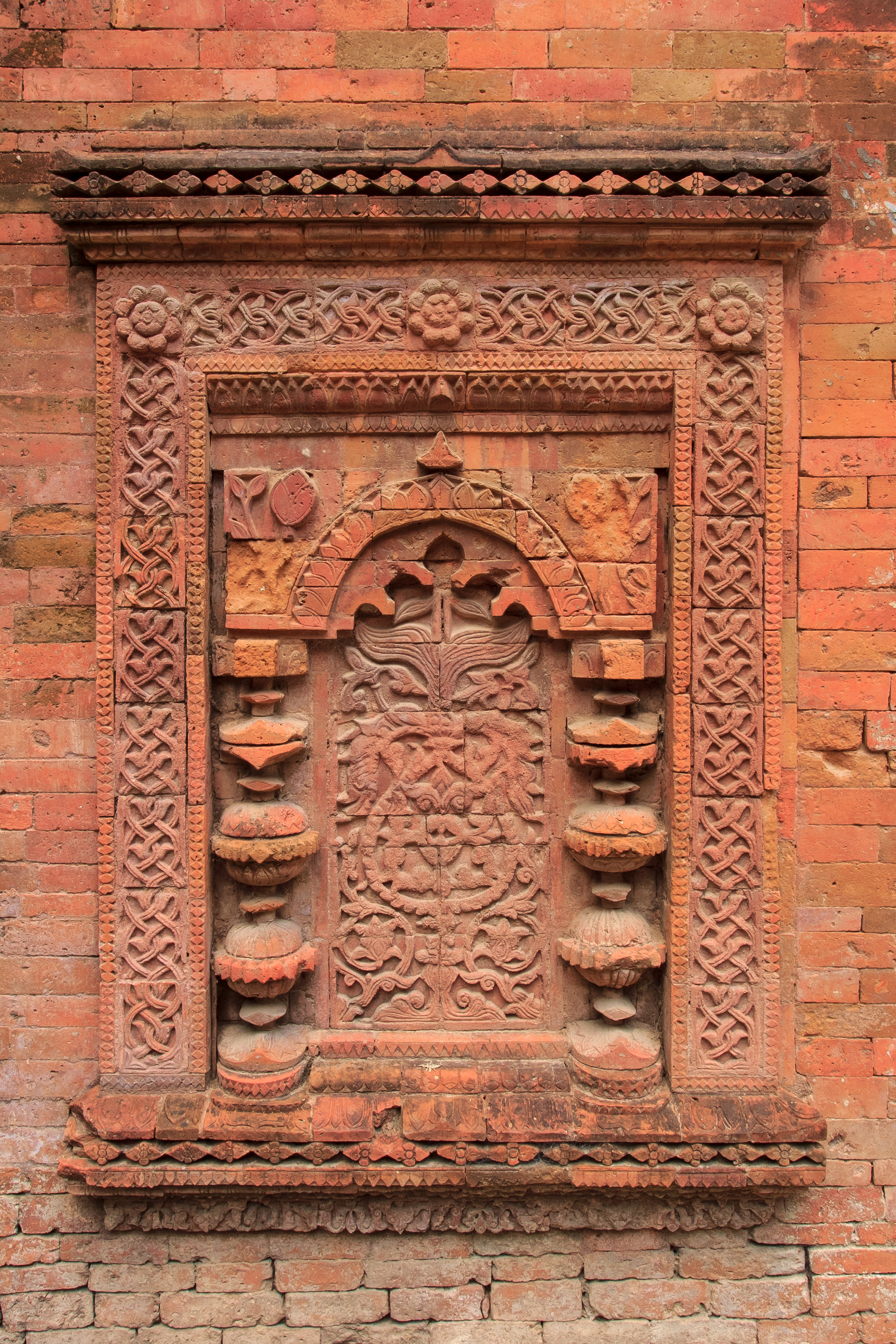
Arabesque and terracotta

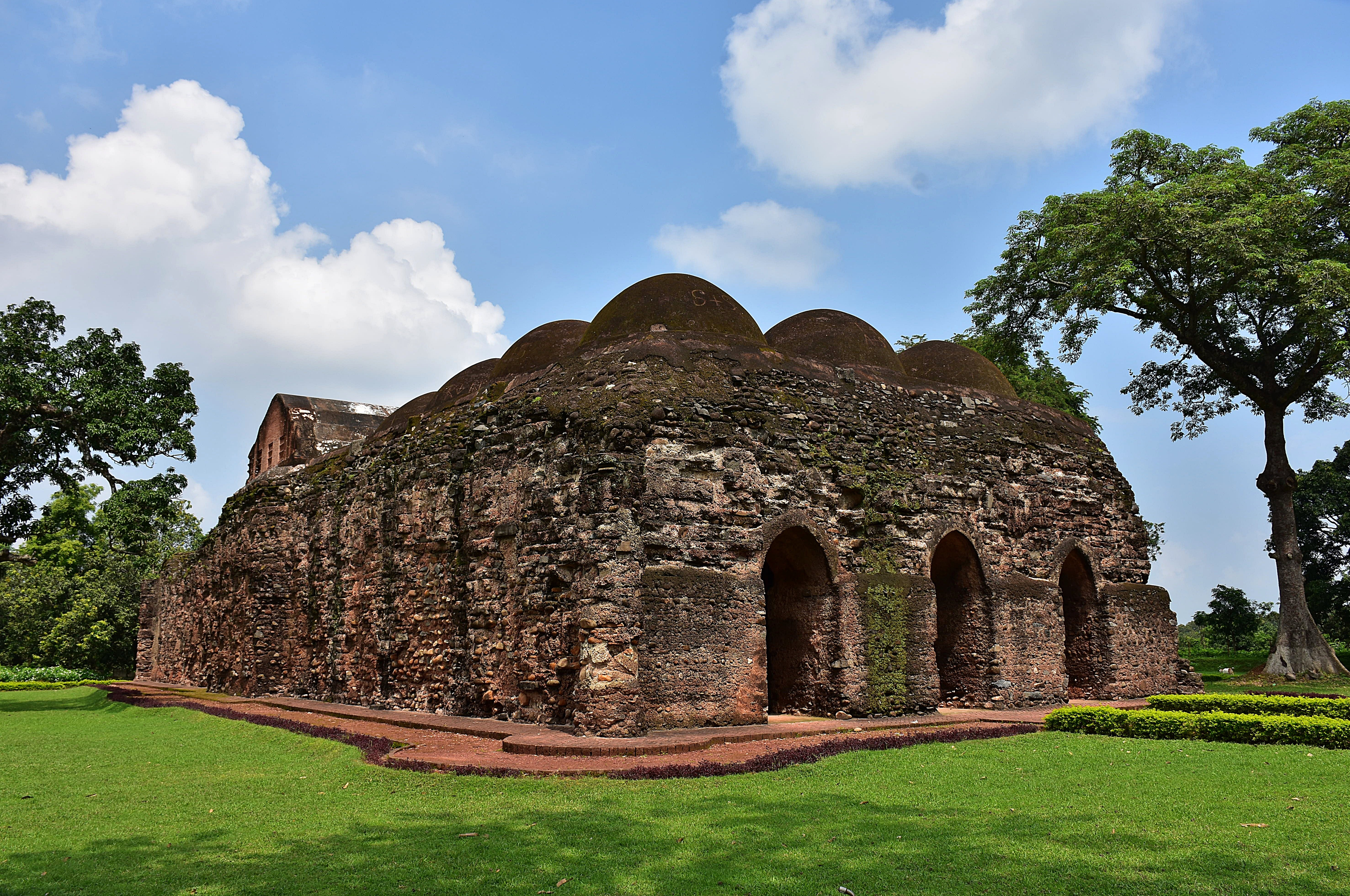
Gunmant Mosque

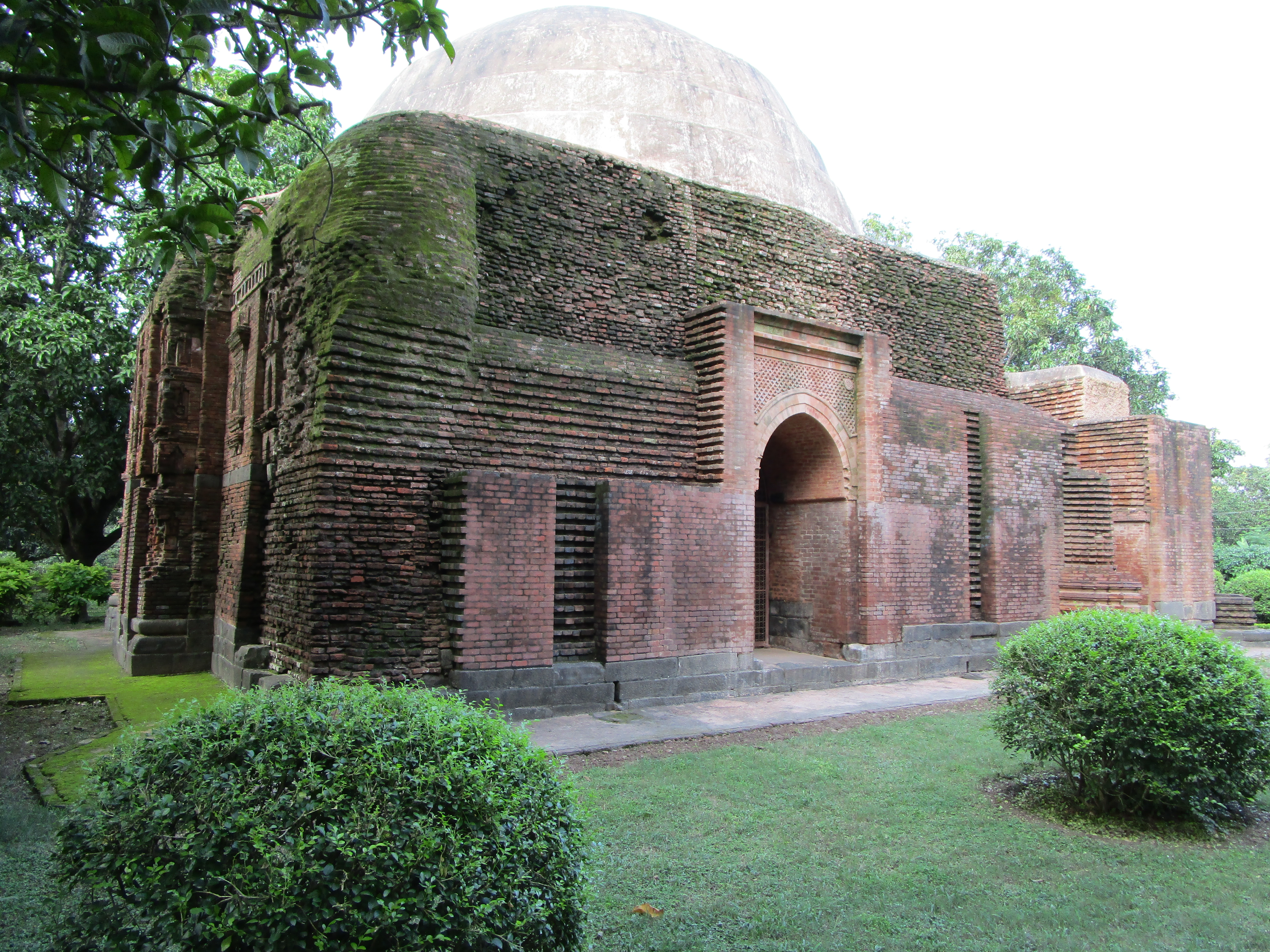
Chamkati Mosque

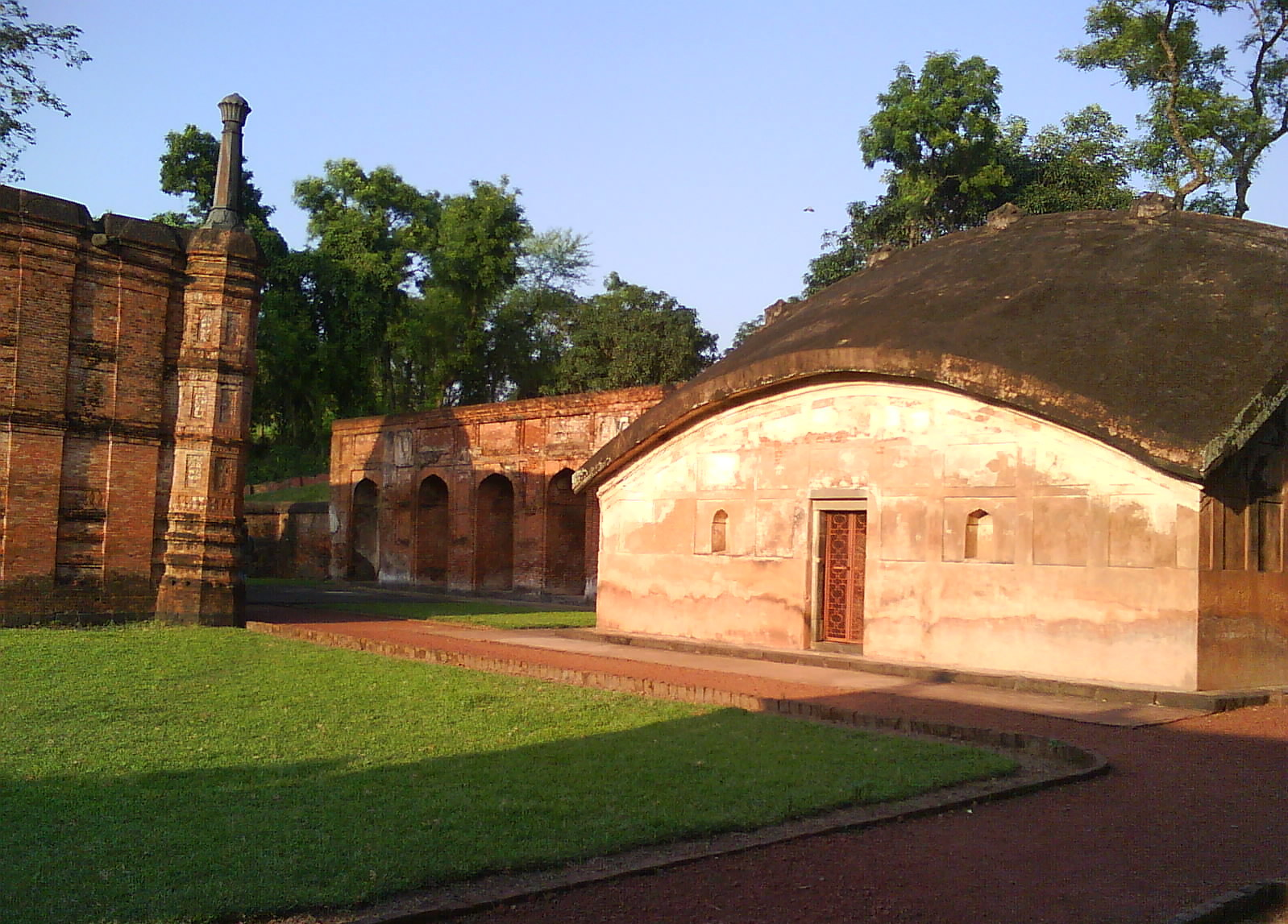
Do-chala tomb of Fateh Khan

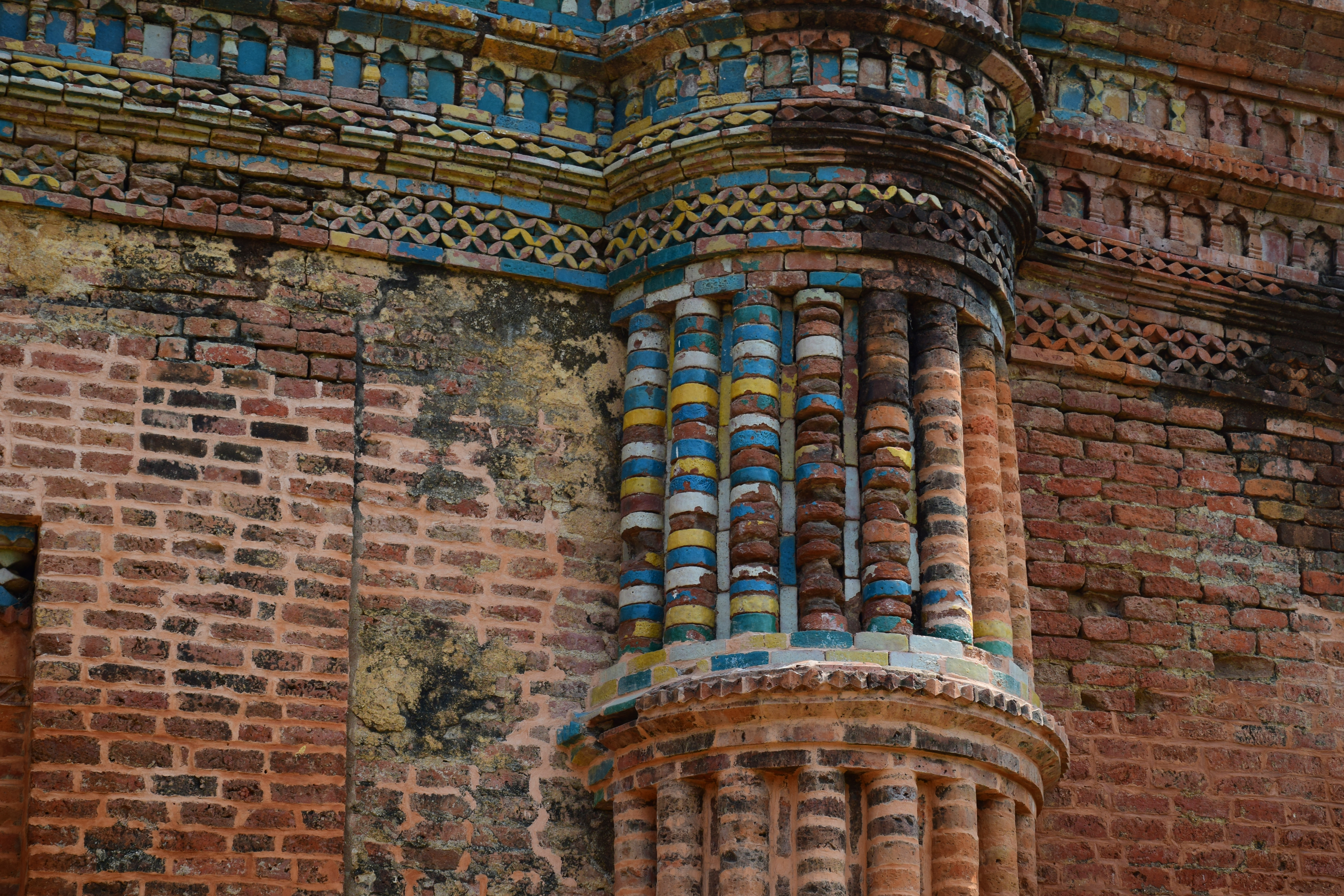
Fading enamelled bricks on Gumti Gate

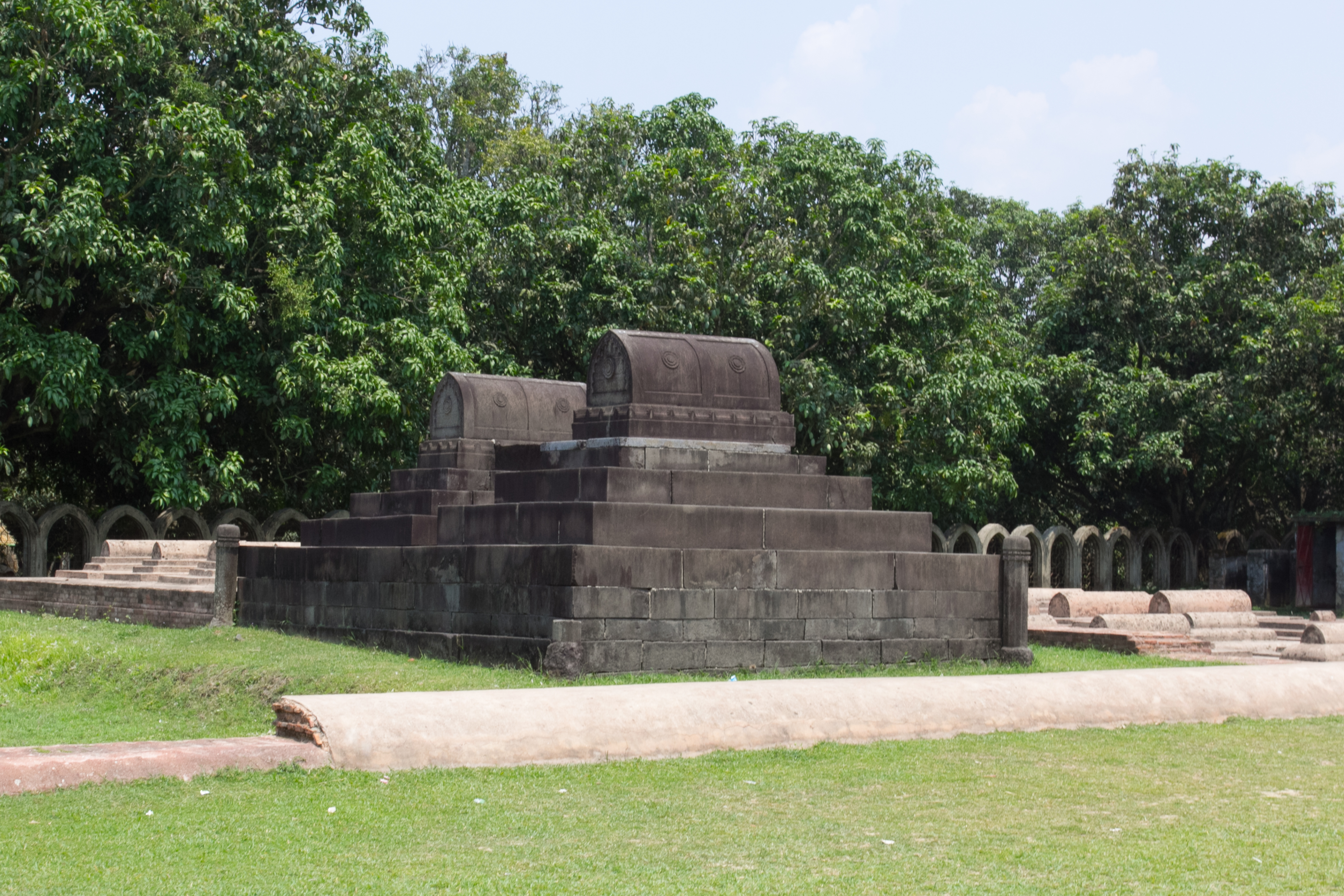
Gravestones resembling the Tomb of Cyrus

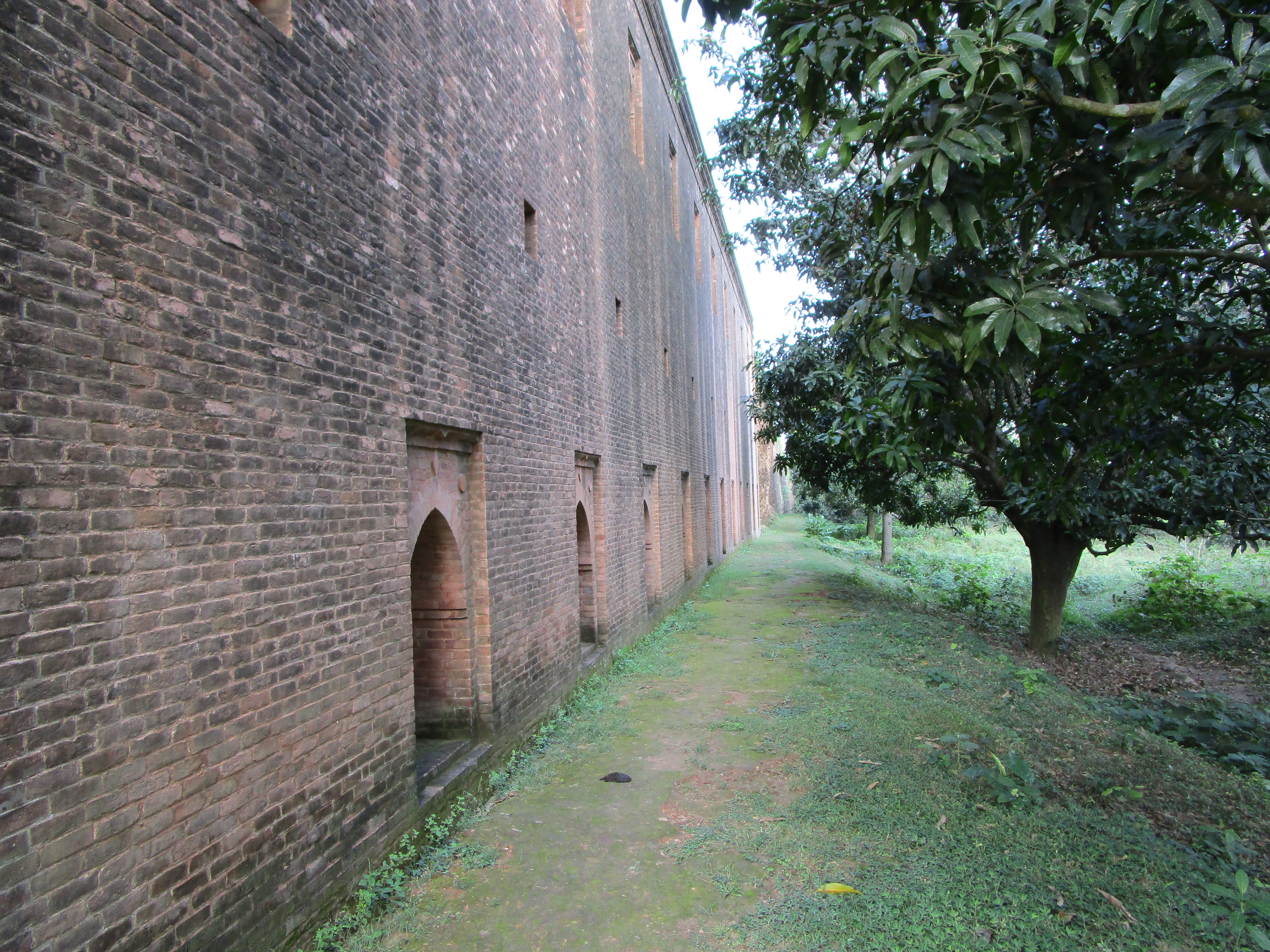
Baisgazi Wall (city wall)

=== Mughal period ===
The Mughals built several structures in Gaur. The two-storeyed Mughal Tahakhana complex was a resting place for viceroys. The tahkhana in Persian means a building with a cool environment. The name indicates that the complex had an indoor ventilation system to moderate humid temperatures. The complex was also used as a Sufi khanqah. The Lukochori Darwaza (hide and seek gate) was erected on the road that led to the complex. The construction of these structures can be traced to the reign of Viceroy Shah Shuja. An outbreak of the plague and a change in the course of the Ganges caused the city to be abandoned. Since then the area has been a heap of ruins in the wilderness and almost overgrown with jungle.

==== Abandonment ====
The great river of Ganges was conventionally linked with the Bhagirathi-Ganga river, but after the late 16th century, the river linked up with Padma as its primary channel and abandoned its channels in the south-western portion of the Bengal Delta. Venetian traveller Cesare Federici observed that ships were unable to sail north of Saptagram for this very reason.

Around the same time the Ganges silted up and abandoned its channels above Gauda, the city, only recently having been captured by Mughal forces, suffered a devastating epidemic and was consequentially abandoned.

Mughal structures of Gaur

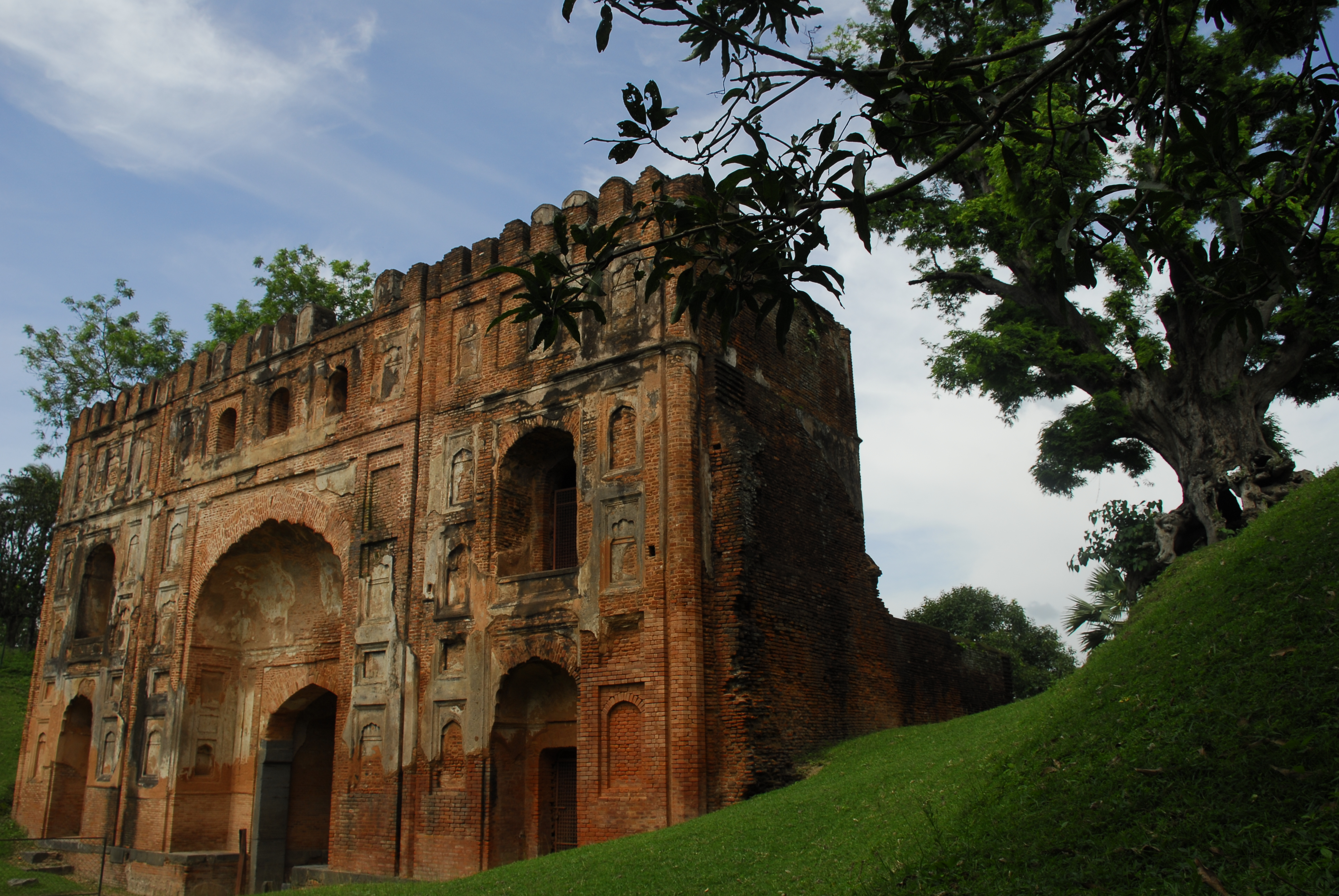
Lukochuri Darwaza lit. 'Hide and seek doorway'

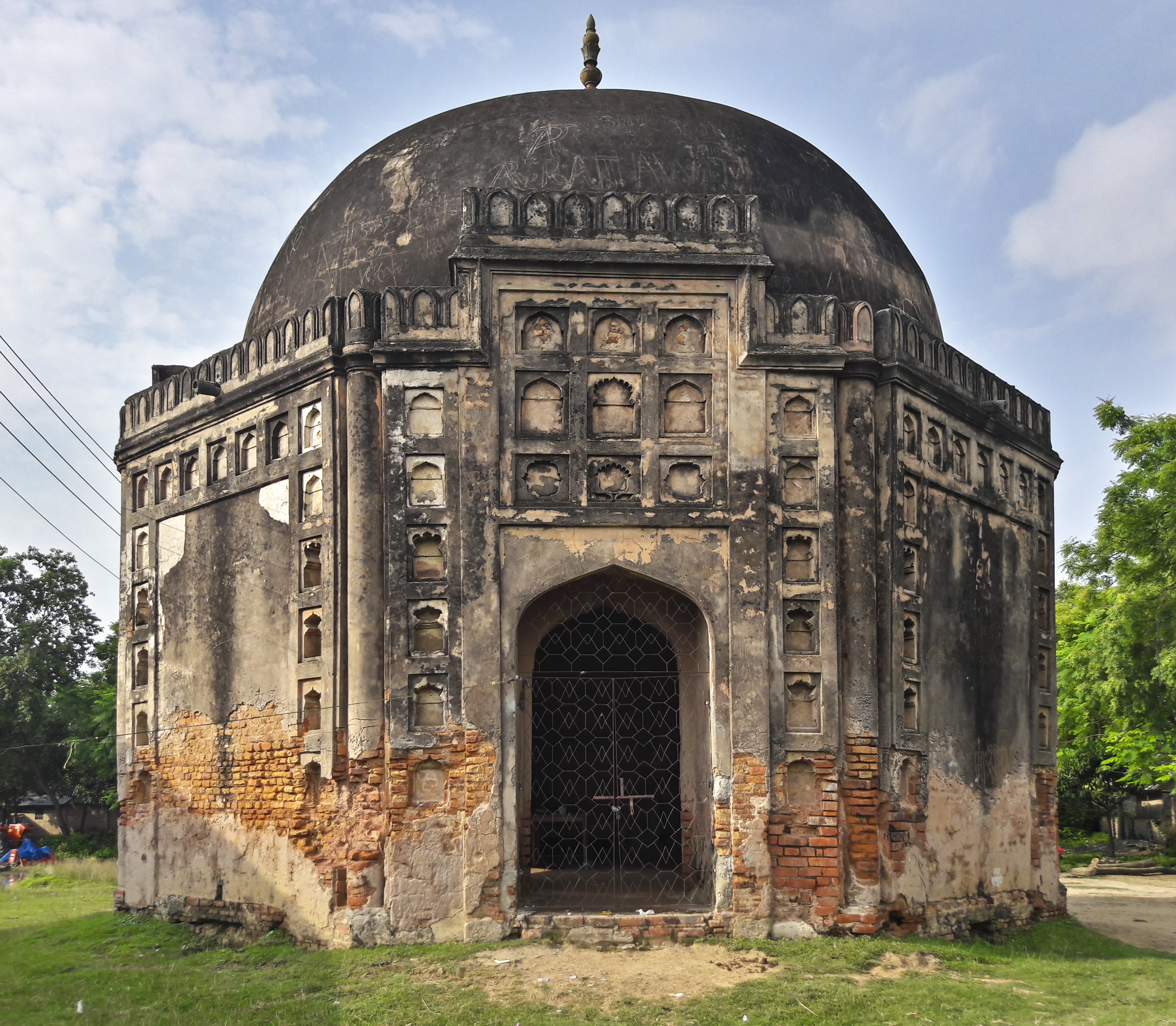
Rohanpur Octagonal Tomb

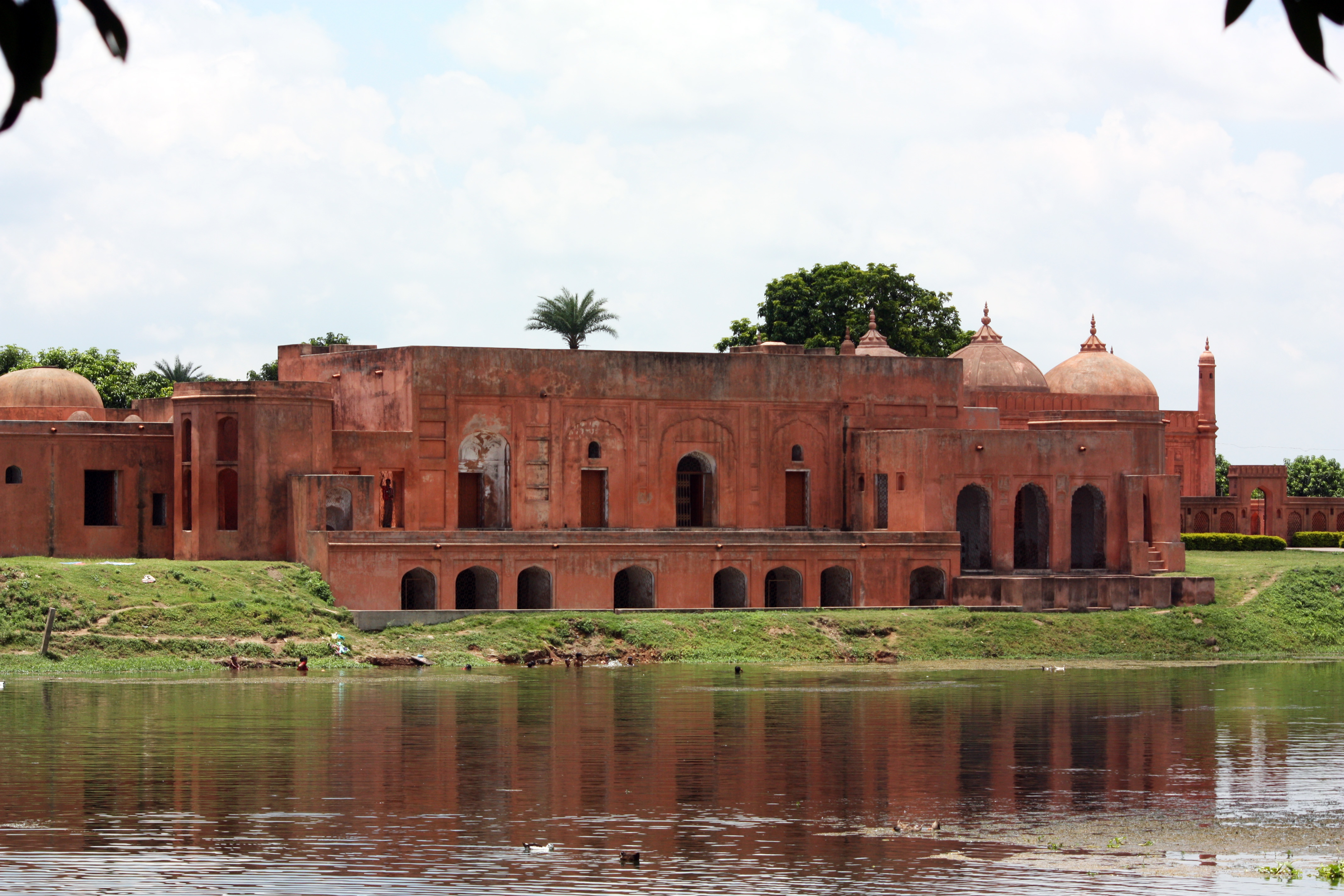
Mughal viceregal lodge

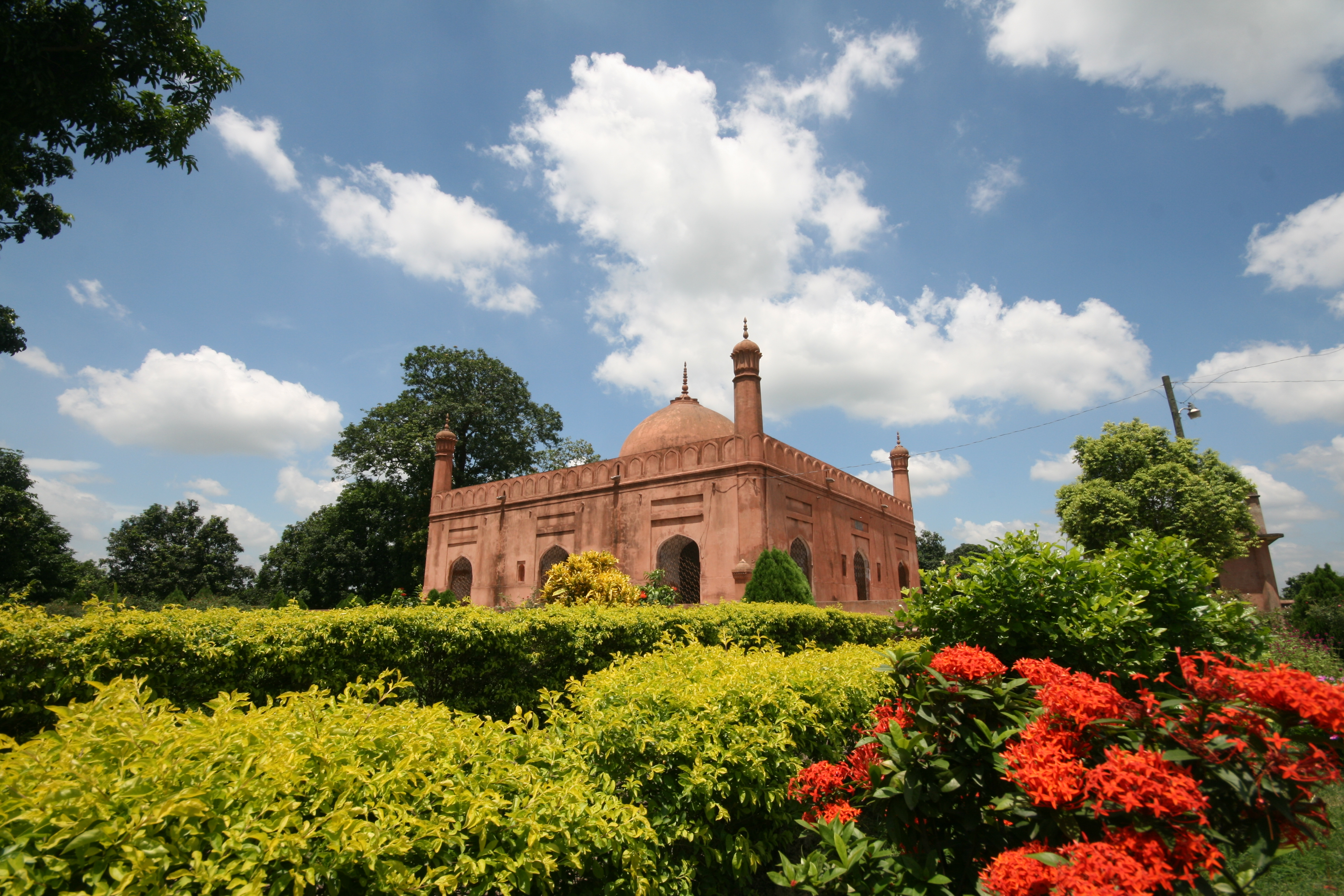
Mughal Sufi shrine

== Historical measurements and statistics ==
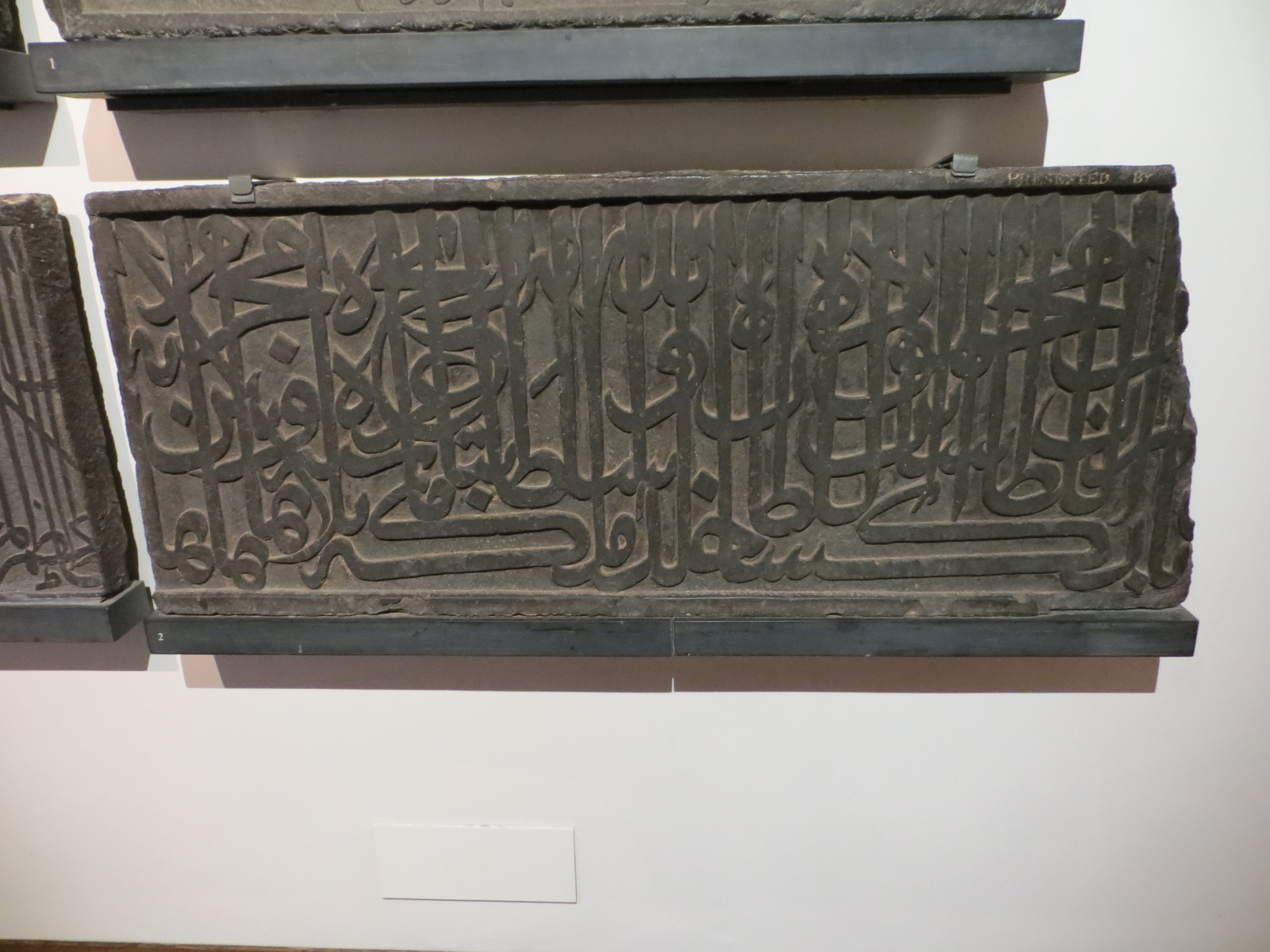
Part of a foundation inscription in the name of Sultan Yusufshah, 1477 AD, British Museum.

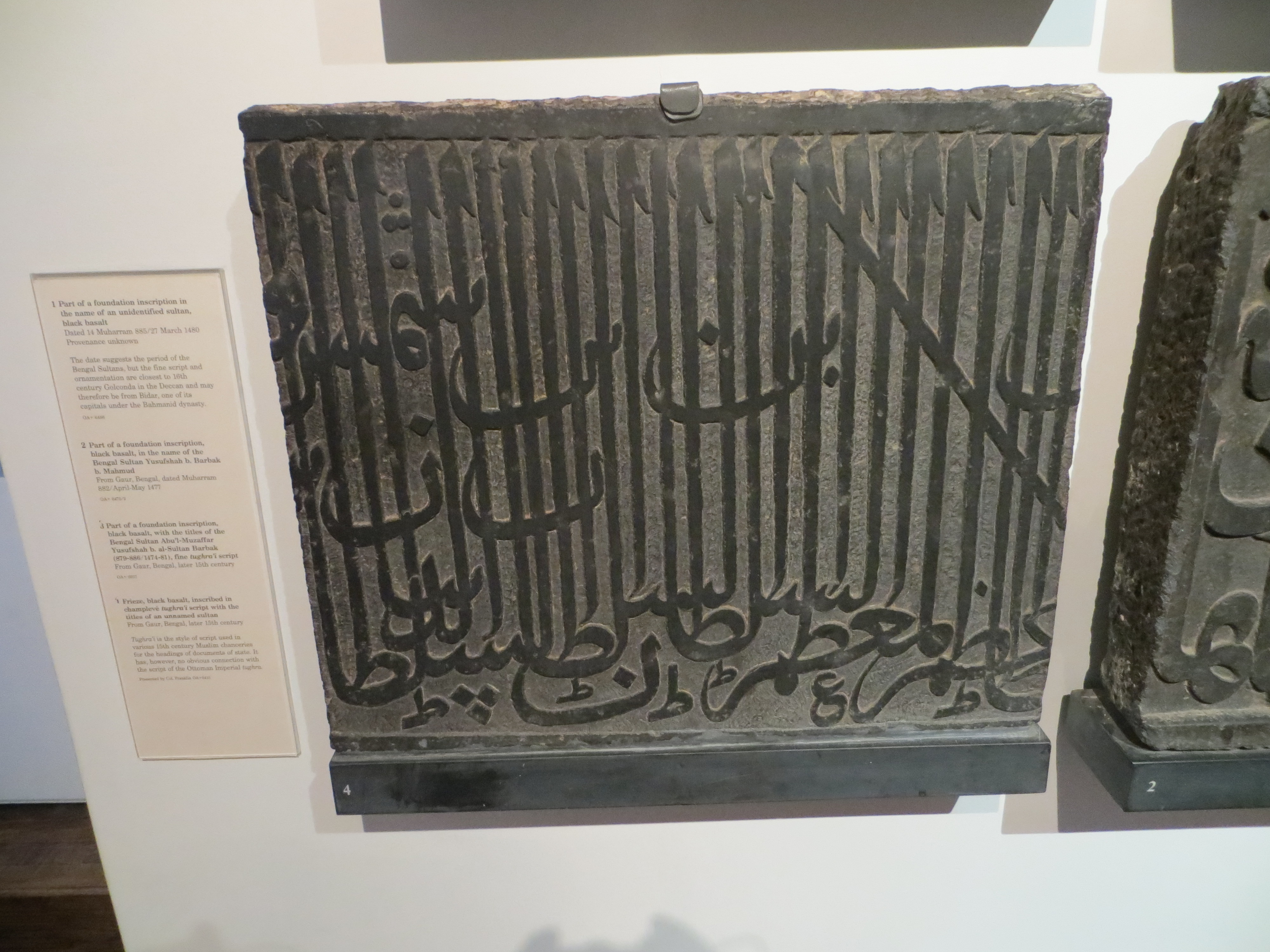
Another inscription from the site in the British Museum 'collected' by Captain William Francklin

The city in its prime measured 7 1/8 km (4.4 mi) from north to south, with a breadth of 1 to 2 km (0.62 to 1.24 mi). With suburbs, it covered an area of 20 to 30 km (12 to 19 mi), and in the 16th century the Portuguese historian Faria y Sousa described it as containing 1,200,000 inhabitants. The ramparts of this walled city (which was surrounded by extensive suburbs) still exist; they were works of vast labour, and were on average about 40 ft (12 m) high, and 180 to 200 ft (61 m) thick at the base. The facing of masonry and the buildings with which they were covered have now disappeared, and the embankments themselves are overgrown with dense jungle. The western side of the city was washed by the Ganges, and within the space enclosed by these embankments and the river stood the city of Gauḍa proper, with the fort containing the palace in its south-west corner. Radiating north, south, and east from the city, other embankments are to be traced running through the suburbs and extending in certain directions for 30 or 40 m. Surrounding the palace is an inner embankment of similar construction to that which surrounds the city, and even more overgrown with jungle. A deep moat protects it on the outside. To the north of the outer embankment lies the Sagar Dighi, a great reservoir, 1600 yd. by 800 yd., dating from 1126.

Fergusson in his History of Eastern Architecture thus describes the general architectural style of Gauḍa:

It is neither like that of Delhi nor Jaunpur, nor any other style, but one purely local and not without considerable merit in itself; its principal characteristic being heavy short pillars of stone supporting pointed arches and vaults in brick whereas at Jaunpore, for instance, light pillars carried horizontal architraves and flat ceilings. Owing to the lightness of the small, thin bricks, which were chiefly used in the making of Gauḍa, its buildings have not well withstood the ravages of time and the weather; while much of its enamelled work has been removed for the ornamentation of the surrounding cities of more modern origin. Moreover, the ruins long served as a quarry for the builders of neighbouring towns and villages, till in 1900 steps were taken for their preservation by the government. The finest ruin in Gauḍa is that of the Great Golden Mosque, also called Bara Darwaza, or twelve doored (1526). An arched corridor running along the whole front of the original building is the principal portion now standing. There are eleven arches on either side of the corridor and one at each end of it, from which the mosque probably obtained its name. These arches are surmounted by eleven domes in fair preservation; the mosque had originally thirty-three.

== Notable structures ==
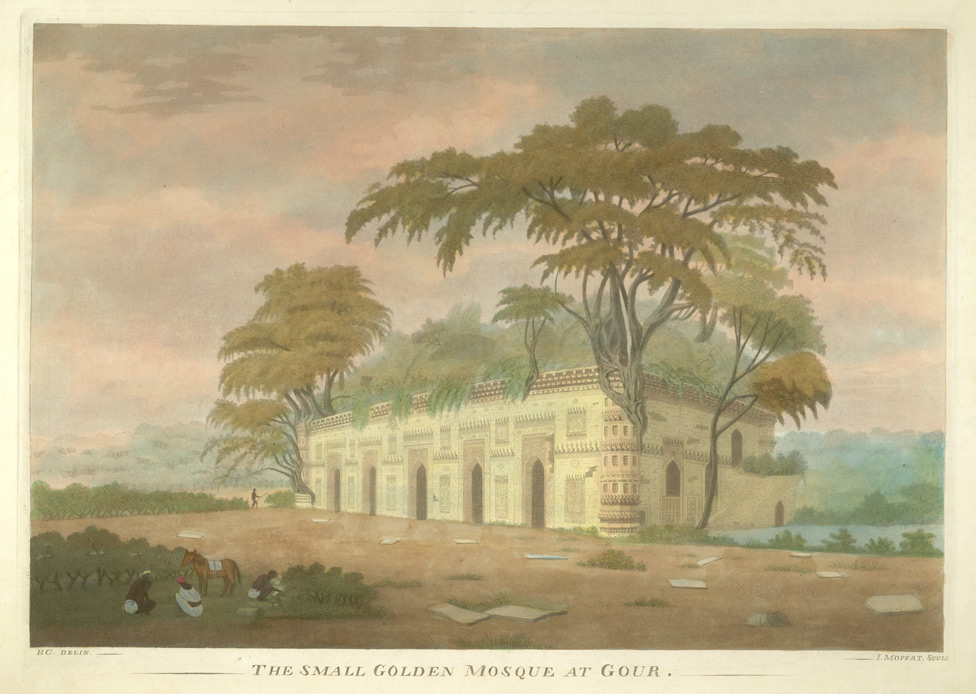
Choto Sona Mosque in 1808

According to Encyclopædia Britannica Eleventh Edition, "The Tantipar mosque (1475–1480) has beautiful moulding in brick, and the Lotan mosque of the same period is unique in retaining its glazed tiles. The citadel, of the Muslim period, was strongly fortified with a rampart and entered through a magnificent gateway called the Dakhil Darwaza (1459–1474). At the south-east corner was a palace, surrounded by a wall of brick 66 ft (20 m) high, of which a part is standing. Nearby were the royal tombs. Within the citadel is the Kadam Rasul mosque (1530), which is still used, and close outside is a tall tower called the Firoz Minar (perhaps signifying tower of victory). There are a number of Muslim buildings on the banks of the Sagar Dighi, including, notably, the tomb of the saint Makhdum Shaikh Akhi Siraj (died 1357), and in the neighbourhood is a burning ghat, traditionally the only one allowed to the use of the Hindus by their Muslim conquerors, and still greatly venerated and frequented by them. Many inscriptions of historical importance have been found in the ruins.."

== Preservation ==
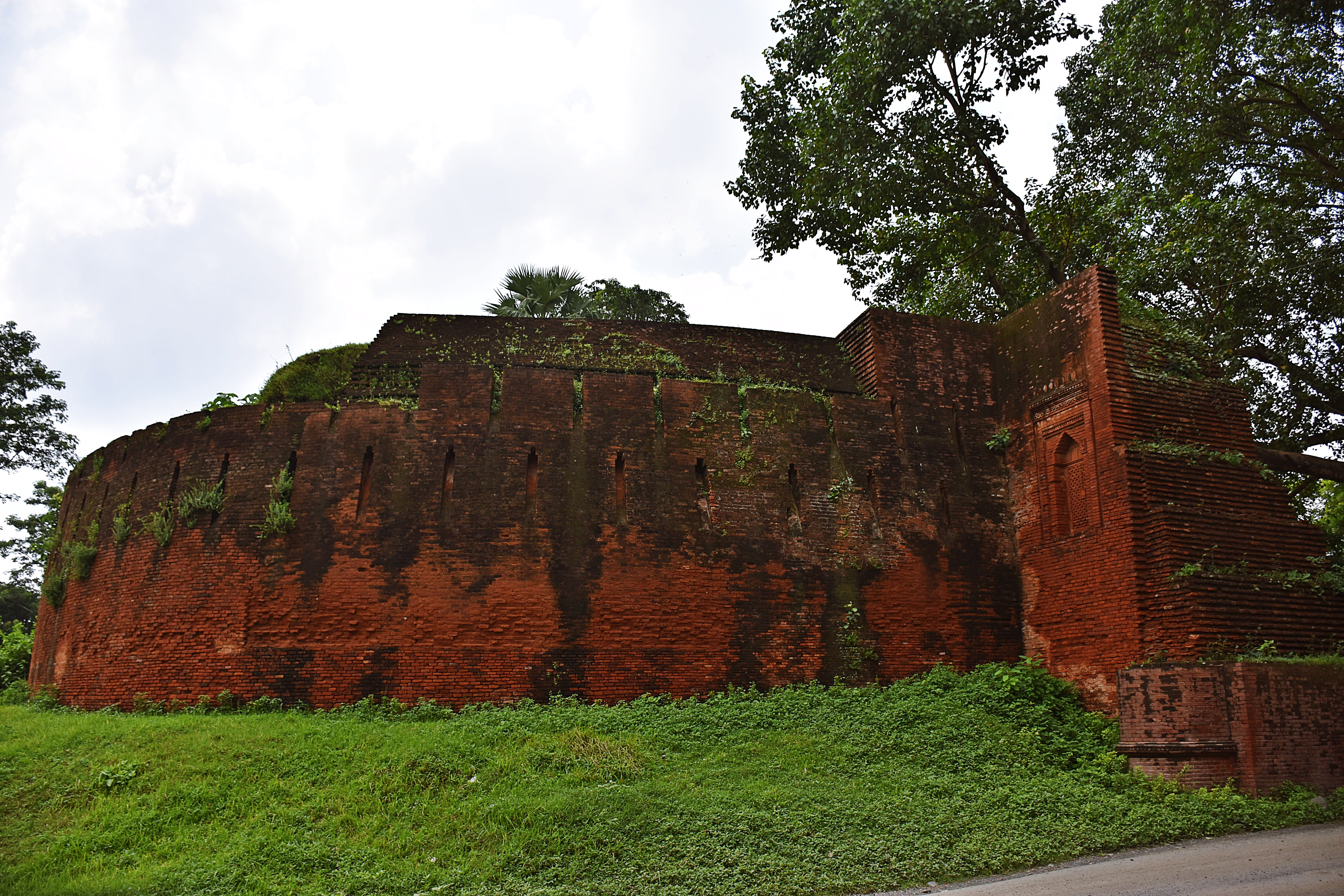
The Kotwali Gate marks the border between Bangladesh and India.

The Archaeological Survey of India and the Department of Archaeology in Bangladesh are responsible for preserving heritage structures in the area. The Bangladeshi Archaeology Department has carried out several projects on both the Bangladeshi and Indian sides of Gauda.

The Indian archaeological survey is also carrying out excavations of a mound about a kilometre from the Chikha building within the Baisgaji Wall, where remains of a palace are turning up. A permanent artifact and photographic exhibition highlighting the major monuments of Gour and the restoration work undertaken by the ASI is being held at the Metcalfe Hall, Kolkata. Among the exhibits are also some fine specimens of brick moulding and glazed tiles from Gour.

== Transport ==
Bus and rail transport are available from Kolkata to Malda town. The nearest railway station is Gour Malda. It is desirable to visit Gauda via Malda Town railway station. Gauda can be accessed through the Sonamosjid checkpoint on the Bangladesh-India border. The checkpoint is located near the Choto Sona Mosque in Chapai Nawabganj district, Bangladesh.
