= Lucknow (disambiguation) =

Lucknow is the capital city of Uttar Pradesh, the most populous state of India.

Lucknow may also refer to:

- Lucknow (Graduates constituency), constituency in the Legislative Council of Uttar Pradesh
- Lucknow (Mayoral Constituency), electoral constituency in the city
- Lucknow (Lok Sabha constituency), Indian parliamentary constituency

== Cities, towns, and villages ==
- Lucknow, a village in the Mayabunder tehsil on Andaman Island
- Lucknow, Angus, Scotland
- Lucknow, Victoria, Australia
- Lucknow, New South Wales, Australia
- Lucknow, Ontario, Canada
- Lucknow, Pennsylvania, USA
- Lucknow, South Carolina, an unincorporated community in Lee County, South Carolina, USA

== Other places, buildings, etc. ==
- Lucknow, an estate now known as Castle in the Clouds in Moultonborough, New Hampshire, USA
- "Lucknow" (song), song by A. R. Rahman from the soundtrack of the 2014 film Million Dollar Arm
- Lucknow Super Giants, a T20 cricket team in the Indian Premier League

== See also ==
- Lakhnauti (disambiguation)
- Lucknawi, toponymic from Lucknow
