= Murshed =

Murshed is both a surname and a given name. Notable people with the name include:

- Hasina Murshed, Bengali politician and educationist
- Niaz Murshed (born 1966), Bangladeshi chess grandmaster
- Mansoob Murshed (born 1958), professor
- Yasmeen Murshed (1945–2025), Bangladeshi political adviser and teacher
- Murshed Al-Arashani, Minister of Justice in Yemen
