= Lakhnauti Turk =

Village in Uttar Pradesh, India

Lakhnauti Turk is a village situated in the Gangoh Mandal of Saharanpur District in Uttar Pradesh, India. It is located 486 kilometres from the state capital at Lucknow.
