= Pancharatna =

Pancharatna or Pancha Ratna is a Sanskrit compound word meaning "five gems" and can refer to the following:

== Hindu temples ==
- Pancharatna (architecture), a style of Hindu temple architecture
- Pancha Ratna Shiva Temple, also known as Bhubaneswar Shiva Mandir, Puthia Upazila, Rajshahi Division, Bangladesh
- Pancha Ratna Govinda Temple, Puthia village, Rajshahi District, Bangladesh
- Shyam Ray Temple also known as Pancha-ratna temple, a Krishna temple in Bankura district, West Bengal, India
- Gokulchand Temple also known as Pancha-ratna temple, a Krishna temple in Gokulnagar, Bankura district, West Bengal, India

== Others ==
- Pancharatna Kriti, a set of five kritis (songs) in Carnatic classical music
- Pancharatnam-Berry phase or geometric phase (classical and quantum mechanics), a phase difference acquired over the course of a cycle
- Five gems in Indian jewellery: gold, diamond, sapphire, ruby and pearl; or pearl, coral, ruby, diamond and emerald
- Five famous narratives from the ancient Indian epic Mahabharata: Bhagavad Gita, Vishnu Sahasranama, Bhishmastavaraja / Krishna Stuti in the Bhagavata Purana (Bhishma's hymn to Krishna at the end of the Kurukshetra War), Anusmriti and Gajendra Moksha

== See also ==
- Ratna (disambiguation)
- Rathna (disambiguation)
- Navaratna (disambiguation)
- Pancha Ratha (disambiguation)
- Panchayatana (temple), a layout style of Hindu temples
- Pancharatra, a Vaishnava sect in ancient India
- Pancharātra (lit. 'Five Nights'), a Sanskrit drama by Bhāsa; based on the Mahabharata
- Pancharanga Kshetrams or Pancharangams, a group of five sacred Hindu temples (abodes/stages of the deity Ranganatha) in south India
