= Navaratna (disambiguation) =

Navaratna is an Indian jewelry style consisting of nine jewels.

Navaratna, a Sanskrit compound word meaning "nine gems", can also refer to the following:

- Navaratnas, a group of nine extraordinary advisors in the court of legendary Indian emperor Vikramaditya, the term is later also applied to advisors of Mughal emperor Akbar and king Krishnachandra Roy of the Nadia Raj
- Navaratna (architecture), an Indian architectural style
- Navratna, a government-owned company of India which has certain financial autonomy
- Navratan Bodh, instructions given in Mahaprabhu Shri Vallabhacharya ji's writings of the Hindu religious group Pushtimarg
- Navratan korma, a mildly spiced Mughlai vegetable curry
- Navaratna Rama Rao (1877–1960), an Indian politician from Mysore

== See also ==
- Ratna (disambiguation)
- Pancharatna (disambiguation)
- Navaratnam, an Indian surname
- Navaratri, a Hindu festival dedicated to the goddess Durga
- Navarathri (1964 film), a 1964 Indian film by A. P. Nagarajan
- Navaratri (1966 film), a 1966 Indian film
- Navarathinam, a 1977 Indian film by A. P. Nagarajan
