= Rattana =

Rattana may refer to:

== Uses ==
- Amphoe Si Rattana, district, in the central part of Sisaket Province, northeastern Thailand
- Norodom Rattana Devi, Cambodian princess and politician
- Veth Rattana (born 1986), Cambodian actress whose popularity rose from 2003 to 2007
- Piyapan Rattana, Thai futsal player
- Woratep Rattana-umpawan, classical guitarist from Thailand
- Rattana Pestonji (1908–1970), Thai film director, producer, screenwriter and cinematographer
- Rattana Petch-Aporn, Thai football player
- Wat Phra Si Rattana Mahathat, Buddhist temple (Wat) in Phitsanulok, Thailand
- A tribe in Survivor: Borneo
- A genus of Braconid wasps in the subfamily Cenocoeliinae

== See also ==
- Ratan (disambiguation)
- Rattan (disambiguation)
- Ratna (disambiguation)
