= Ratnam =

Ratnam may refer to

== People ==
- Anita Ratnam, Indian dancer
- A.M. Ratnam, Indian film producer
- Kakani Venkata Ratnam, Indian politician
- Mani Ratnam, Indian film director
- Samantha Ratnam, Australian social worker and politician
- Suhasini Ratnam, Indian actress
- Raghupathi Venkataratnam Naidu, Indian social reformer
- Madineni Venkat Ratnam, Indian atmospheric scientist

== Cinema ==
- Money Ratnam, a 2014 Indian Malayalam-language film
- Rangula Ratnam (disambiguation)

== Other ==
- Ratnam SC, Sri Lankan football club

== See also ==
- Ratna (disambiguation)
- Rathnam (film), an Indian Tamil-language film by Hari
