= Cenocoelius huggerti =

Scientific classification
- Domain: Eukaryota
- Kingdom: Animalia
- Phylum: Arthropoda
- Class: Insecta
- Order: Hymenoptera
- Family: Braconidae
- Genus: Cenocoelius
- Species: C. huggerti

Binomial name
- Cenocoelius huggerti Pitz & Sharkey, 2005

Species of wasp

Cenocoelius huggerti is a species of hymenopteran insect belonging to the family Braconidae. It is only known from a single female collected from Bakau in Gambia in 1978. It is the only known member of the subfamily Cenocoeliinae from the Afrotropical realm. This generally dark insect has a body length of 4.9 mm. The species is named after the collector of the only specimen, the late Lars Huggert.
