= Raghunatha Temple, Alangiri =

Hindu Temple at Alangiri, West Bengal

Raghunatha Temple
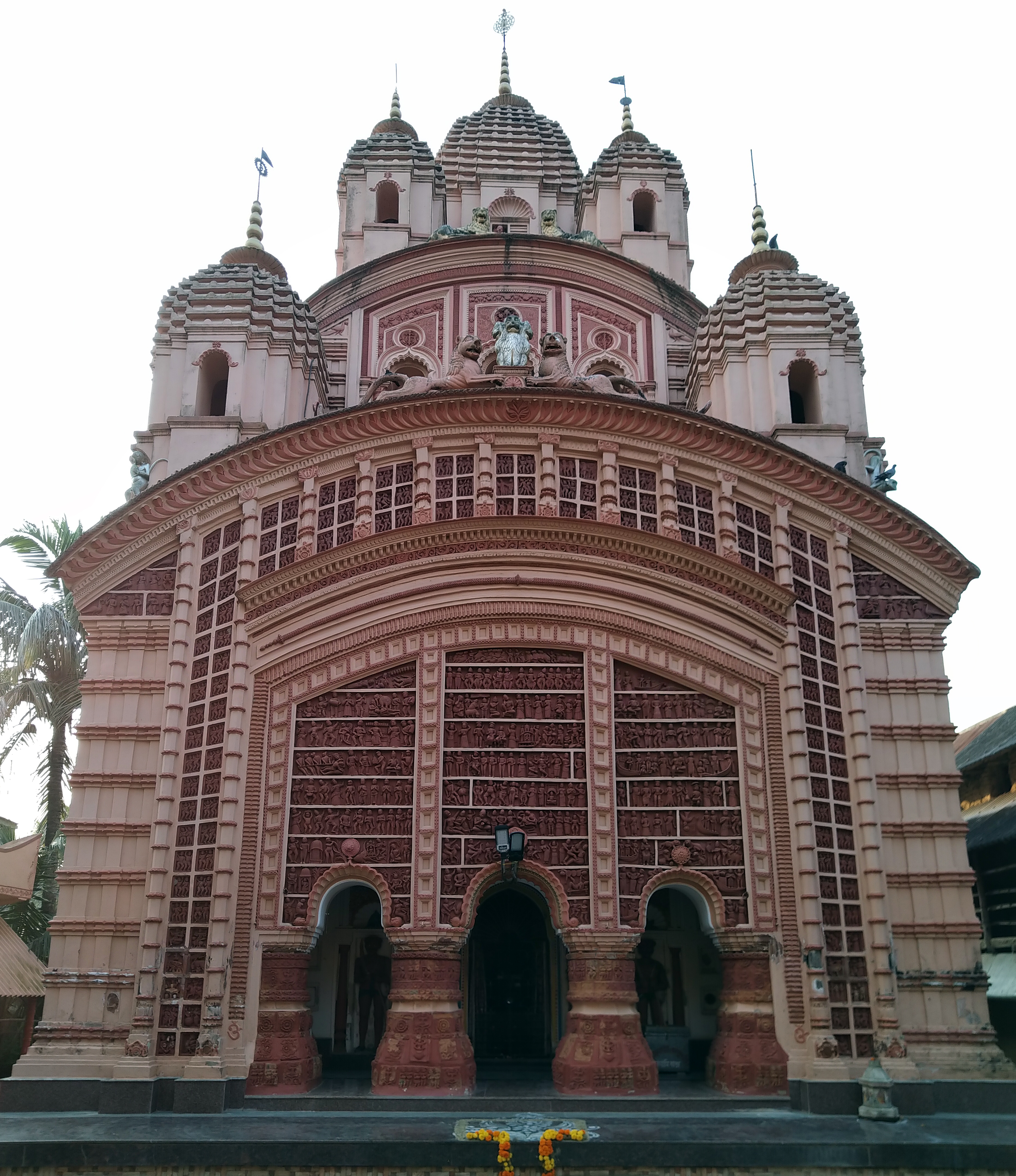
- View of the temple

- Location within West Bengal

Religion
- Affiliation: Hinduism
- District: Purba Medinipur
- Deity: Raghunath

Location
- Location: Alangiri
- State: West Bengal
- Country: India
- Interactive map of Raghunatha Temple
- Coordinates: 21°50′47.73″N 87°28′9.32″E

Architecture
- Type: Bengal architecture
- Style: Naba-ratna
- Founder: Das family
- Completed: 1810; 216 years ago
- Temple: 1 main temple of Raghunath

Raghunath Temple is located at the village of Alangiri near the town of Egra. This temple was established in 1810 by the Das family. Situated on a high plinth within the walled courtyard of the family residence, this massive Naba-ratna temple has triple-arched verandahs on three sides and is nearly 40 feet high, making it one of the largest temples in Midnapore.

== Gallery ==
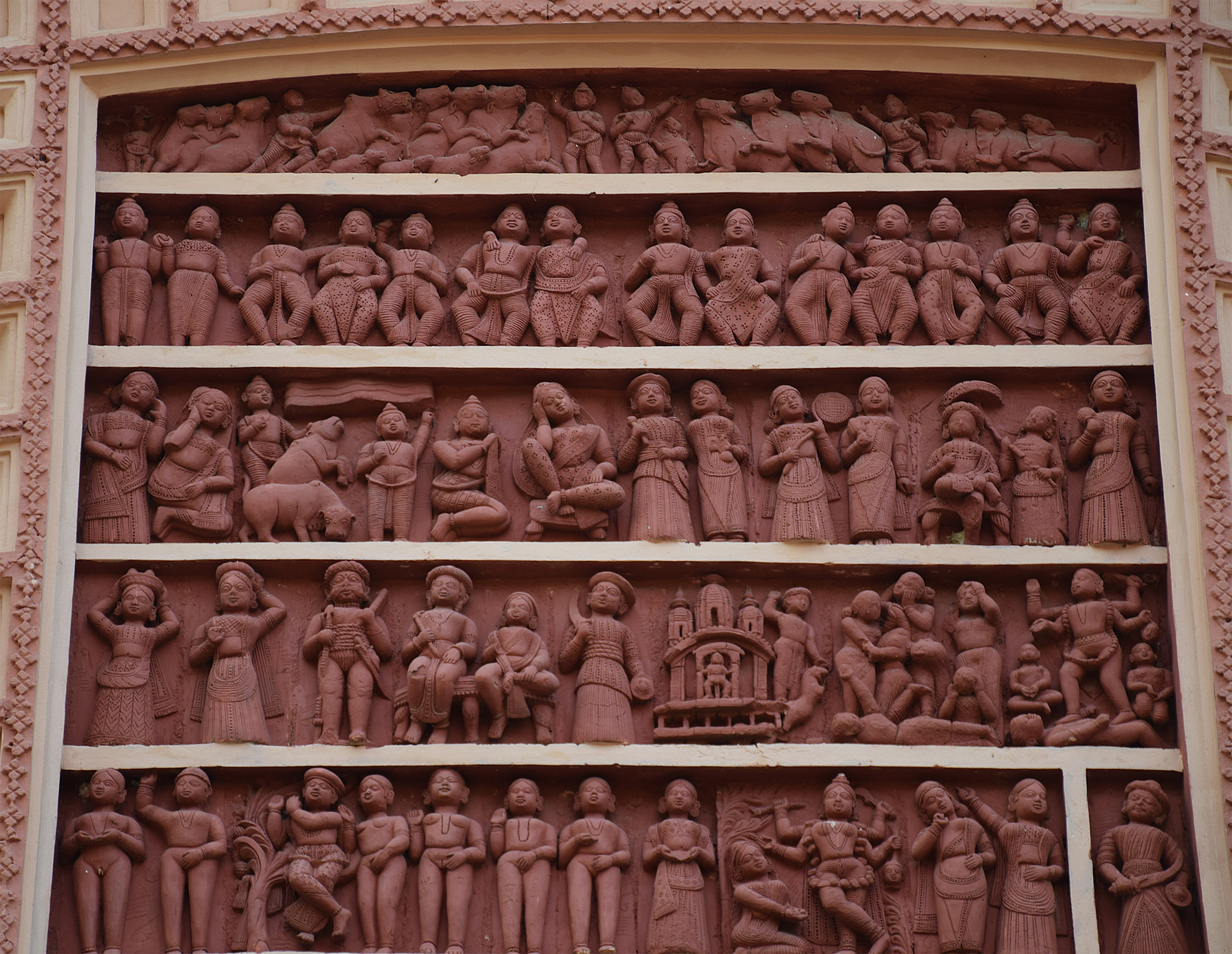

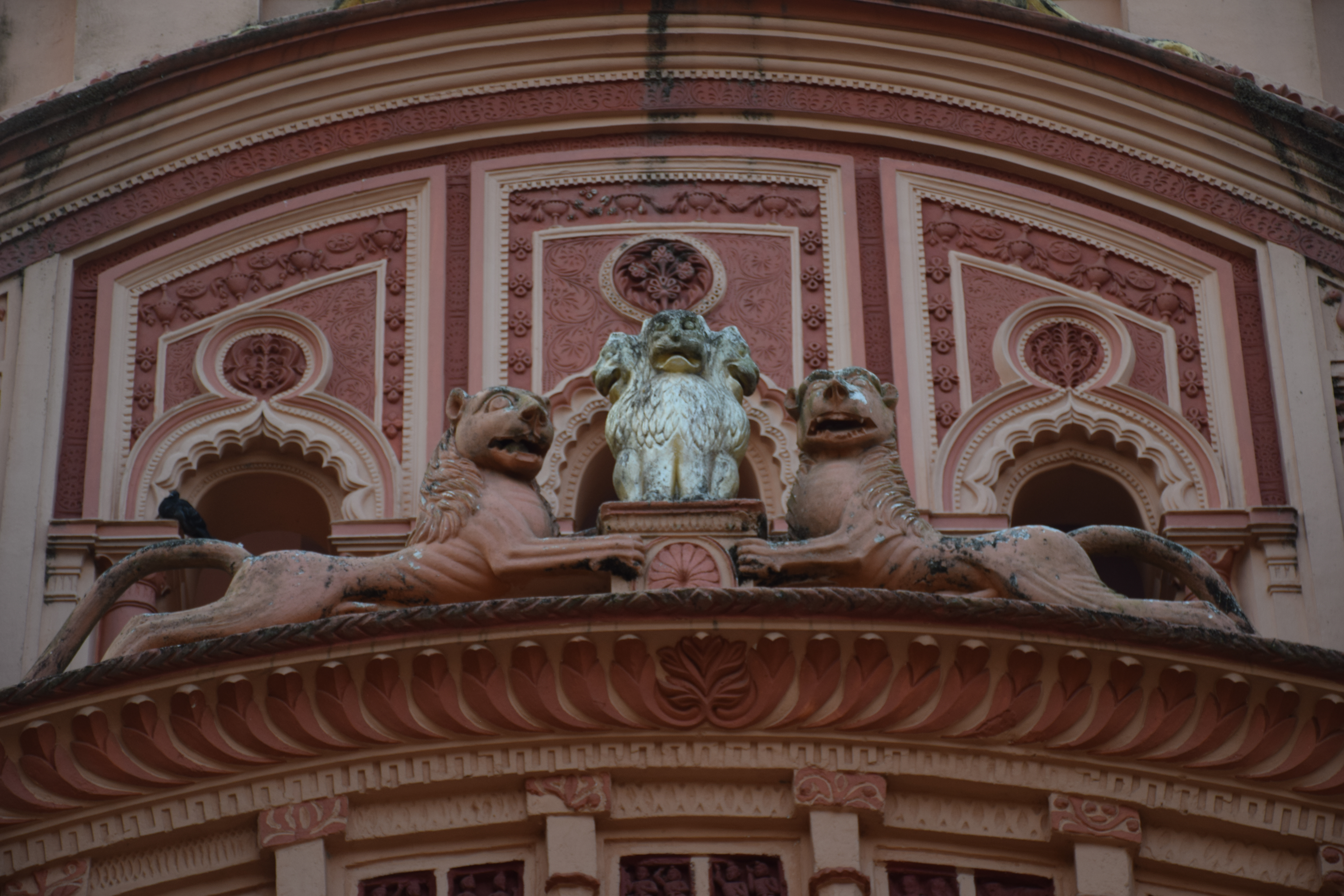

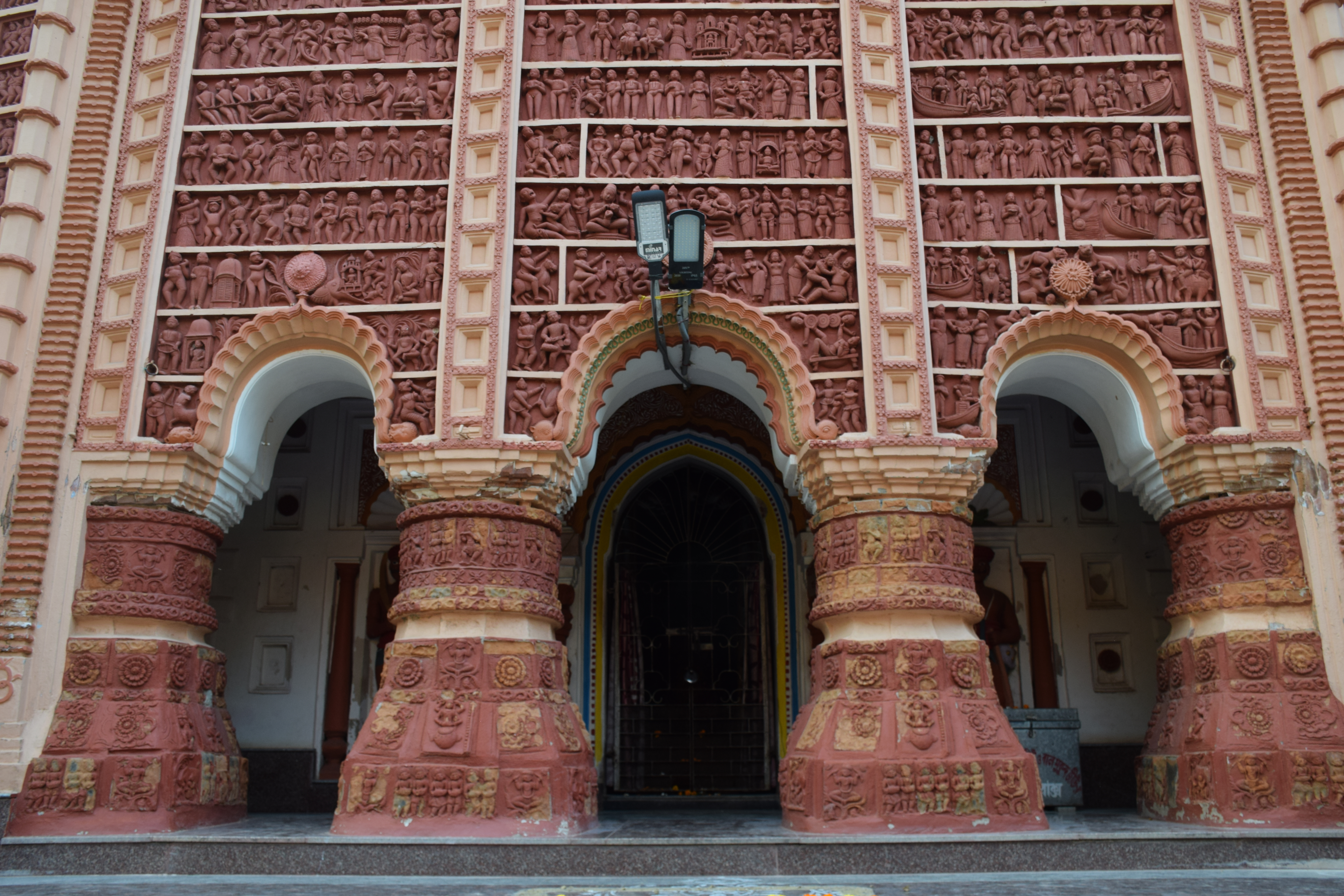

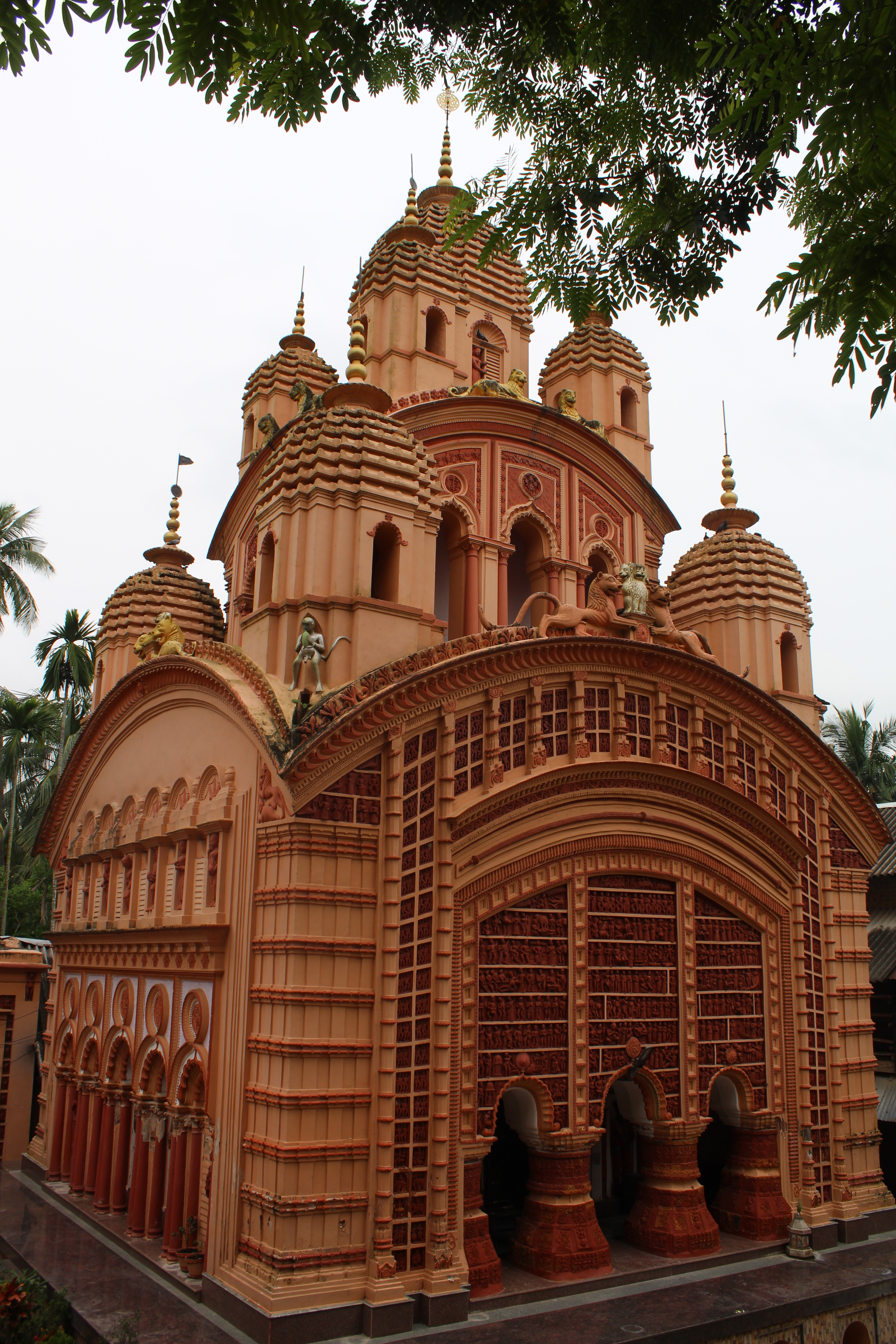
