= Rattan (disambiguation) =

Rattan may refer to:

- Rattan - the name for roughly 600 species of old world climbing palms belonging to subfamily Calamoideae. It may also refer to baskets and furniture made from the plants.
- Rattan, Oklahoma - town in Pushmataha County, Oklahoma, United States
- Hind Rattan - an award granted annually to non-resident persons of Indian origin.
- Rattan (film) - 1944 Indian Bollywood film
- Rattan Lal Kataria - Indian politician from Haryana
- Rattan Jaidka - Malaysian-born English county cricketer
- Rattan Bai - the ancestress of several Bollywood film stars
- Rattan (Ludhiana West) - village located in the Ludhiana West tehsil, of Ludhiana district, Punjab
- Volney Rattan - American botanist
- Rattan (Chinese TV series) - 2021 Chinese television series
- Rattan (island) – modern Roatan in the Bay Islands, Honduras

== See also ==
- Ratan (disambiguation)
- Rattana (disambiguation)
