= Woratep Rattana-umpawan =

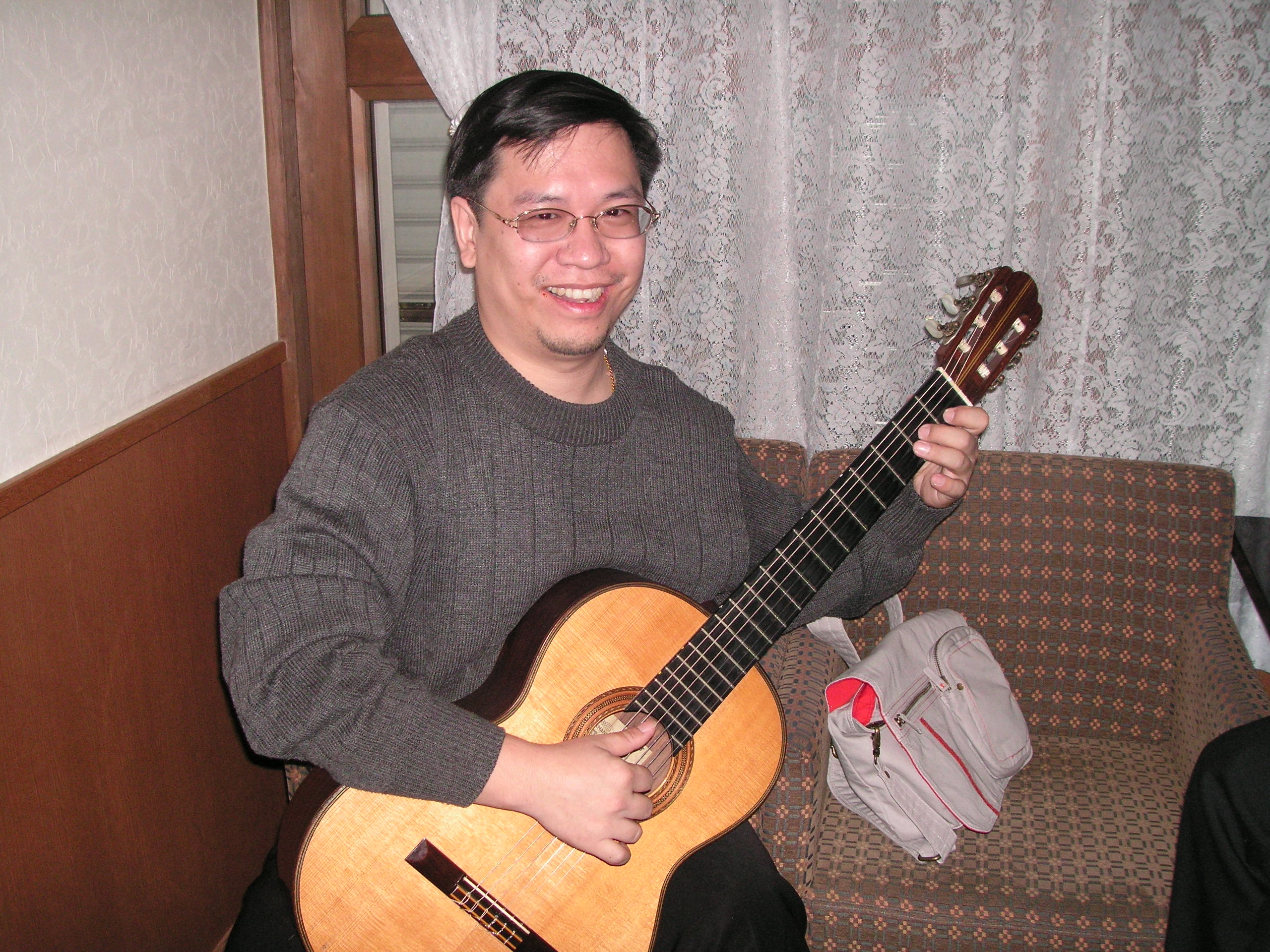
Woratep Rattana-umpawan in Japan 2008

Woratep Rattana-umpawan (born August 1, 1969 in Bangkok) is a classical guitarist from Thailand. He is the founder of the Thailand Guitar Society and the Asia International Guitar Festival, Bangkok.

== Life ==
Woratep Rattana-umpawan began his guitar lessons when he was 12. He was the First Prize Winner of the Yamaha Guitar Festival Competition in Bangkok for three consecutive years from 1985 to 1987. In 1987 he entered the Faculty of Fine and Applied Arts at Chulalongkorn University and earned a B.A. with second-class honors in Western Music, majoring in Classical Guitar.

With his talents and skills in performance, he was invited to play solo in the "Chao Phraya Concerto" composed by Prof. Bruce Gaston in 1993.

Woratep was once again invited by one of the most famous musical institutions in Japan to perform in three recitals in April 2000. In November 2000, he had an opportunity to take a private lesson with Mr. Eduardo Fernandez, the world famous guitarist, when Fernandez was performing a concert in Bangkok.

Woratep performs at international guitar festivals in many parts of the world and often in duo with Leon Koudelak. His works, such as Guitar Lai Thai I, II are available on cassettes and CDs. Woratep is the first Thai classical guitarist who has performed worldwide at International Guitar Festivals is the first Thai classical guitarist to be well-known in the world.

== Teaching ==
In 1991, Woratep was Head of the Guitar Department at Chinatkarn Music School.

Woratep Rattana-umpawan is full-time teacher at the Conservatory of Music, Rangsit University in Bangkok and also taught at the Thailand Guitar Society. His influence and involvement in education have had great influence on the younger Thai guitarist generation.

== Guitars ==
Woratep uses a "Torres" replica by Yuichi Imai.

== Discography ==
- Guitar Lai Thai
- Guitar Lai Thai vol.2

== Editions ==
- Two Thai Traditional Songs

(Soi Saeng Daeng, Kahmane Lai Kwa-ai, Chern Jao) Edition "Homa Dream" HM099
