= Ratna =

Ratna (रत्न) (also Rathna or Rathan) is a Sanskrit term for "jewel". It is also a popular female Hindu name.

Ratna may refer to:

== People ==
- Ratna, Queen Mother of Nepal (born 1928), Queen Consort of Nepal from 1955 to 1972
- Ratna Fabri, museologist of India
- Ratna Galih (born 1988), Indonesian model and actress
- Ratna Intikasari or better known as Ratna Antika (born 1989), Indonesian dangdut singer
- Ratna Pathak (born 1963), Indian actress of Bollywood films
- Ratna Listy, whose full name is Ratna Sulistyaningsih (born 1973), Indonesian actress
- Ratna Sari Devi Sukarno (born 1940), one of the wives of the first President of Indonesia, Sukarno
- Ratna Sarumpaet (born 1949), Indonesian human rights activist
- Ratna Singh (born 1959), Indian politician from the Indian National Congress party

== Other uses ==
- The 14 ratnas that emerged from the sea of milk during the Samudra manthan
- The Ratna is the pinnacle of a Hindu temple
- Bharat Ratna, India's highest civilian award
- Karnataka Ratna, highest civilian honour of the State of Karnataka
- Punjab Ratan, award in Punjab, India

== See also ==
- Pancharatna (disambiguation)
- Rathna (disambiguation)
- Ratnam (disambiguation)
- Navaratna (disambiguation)
- Ratnakar (disambiguation)
- Ratan (disambiguation)
- Rattana (disambiguation)
- Ratner (disambiguation)
