= Leon Koudelak =

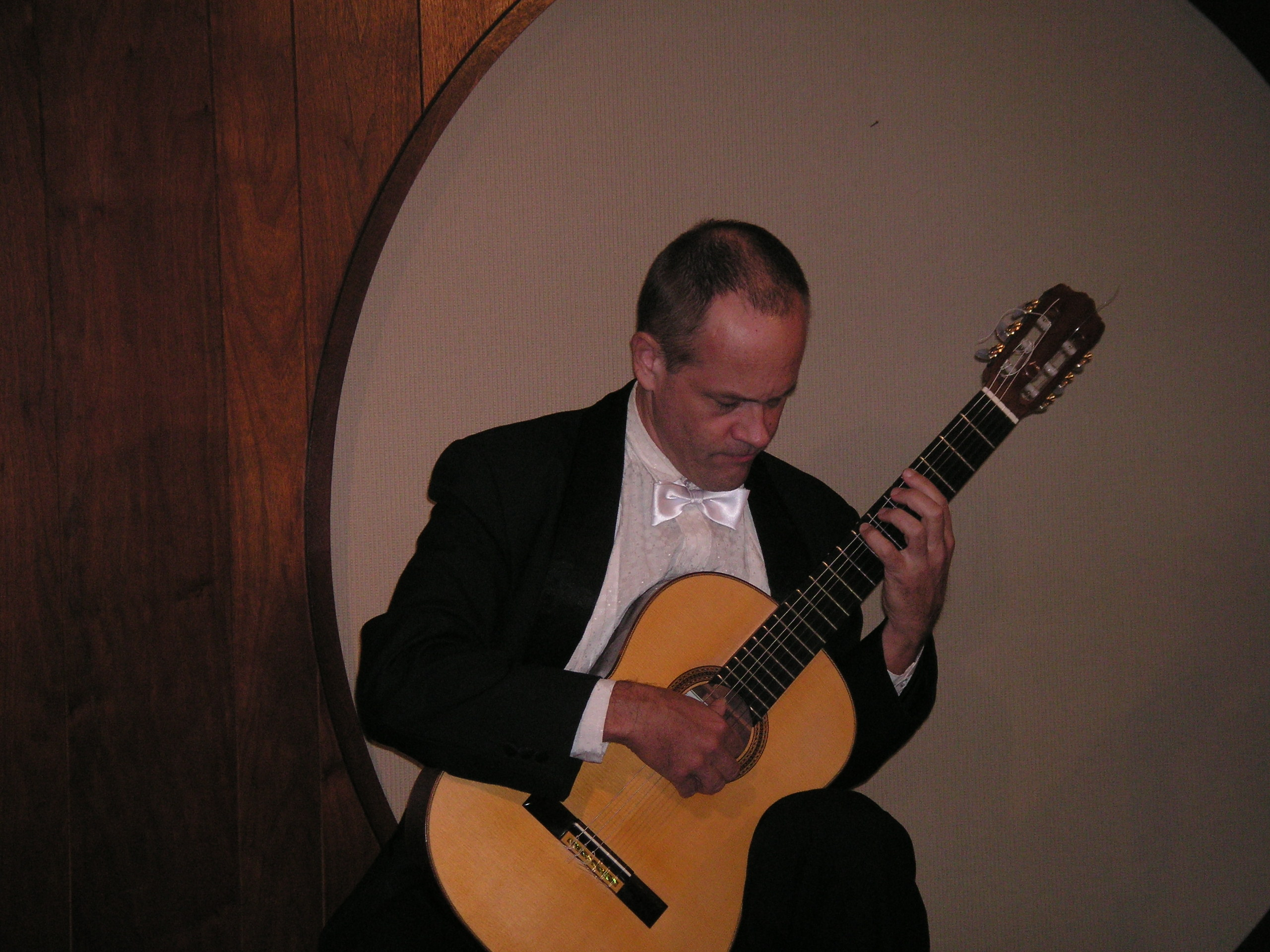
- Leon Koudelak in Nagoya 2007

Background information
- Born: 17 July 1961 (age 65); Krnov, Czechoslovakia
- Genre: Classical music
- Instrument: Guitar
- Years active: 1977–present
- Labels: Tyrolis Music (A); Tyrolis Classic (FL)
- Website: Official website

Leon Koudelak (born 17 July 1961) is a Czech classical guitarist.

He has toured internationally in most parts of Europe, Asia and the Americas. He inspired the composer Michael Buchrainer to write guitar music. In addition to his concert career, he co-founded the Liechtenstein Guitar Festival (Ligita), the Asia International Guitar Festival (AIGF) in Bangkok and the Pattaya Classical Guitar Festival. For the XIV Festival Hispanoamericano de Guitarra, Manuel Zavala y Alonso described him as "La mano santa de la guitarra" ('the holy hand of the guitar'). In 1996 he released a CD with the major guitar solo works by Joaquin Rodrigo. Rodrigo wrote him a letter expressing great enthusiasm after listening to his CD about his interpretation. On the following concert tour, Koudelak played a complete program with works by Joaquin Rodrigo.

== Early life and career ==
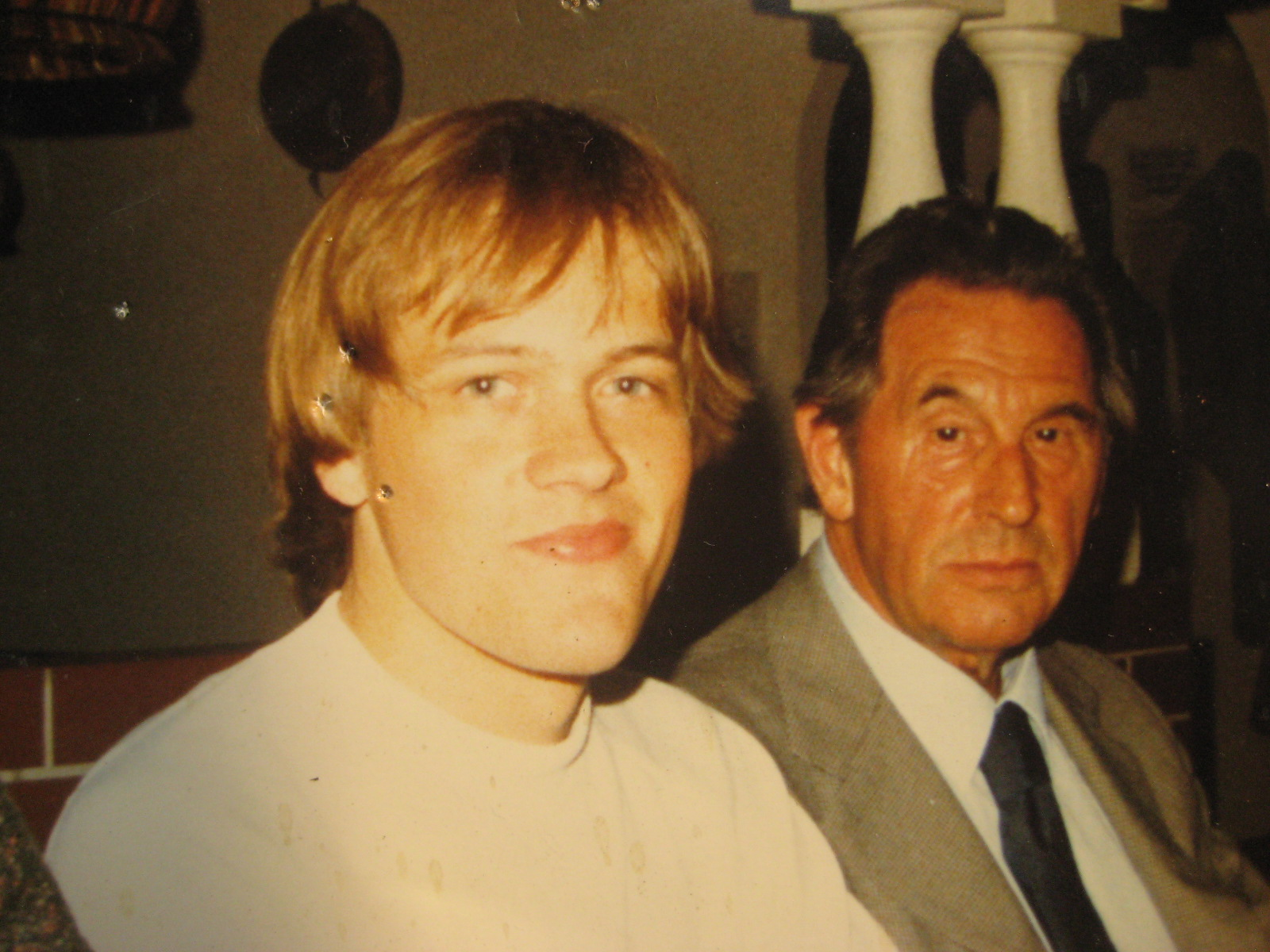
Leon Koudelak and Karl Scheit in Vienna 1981

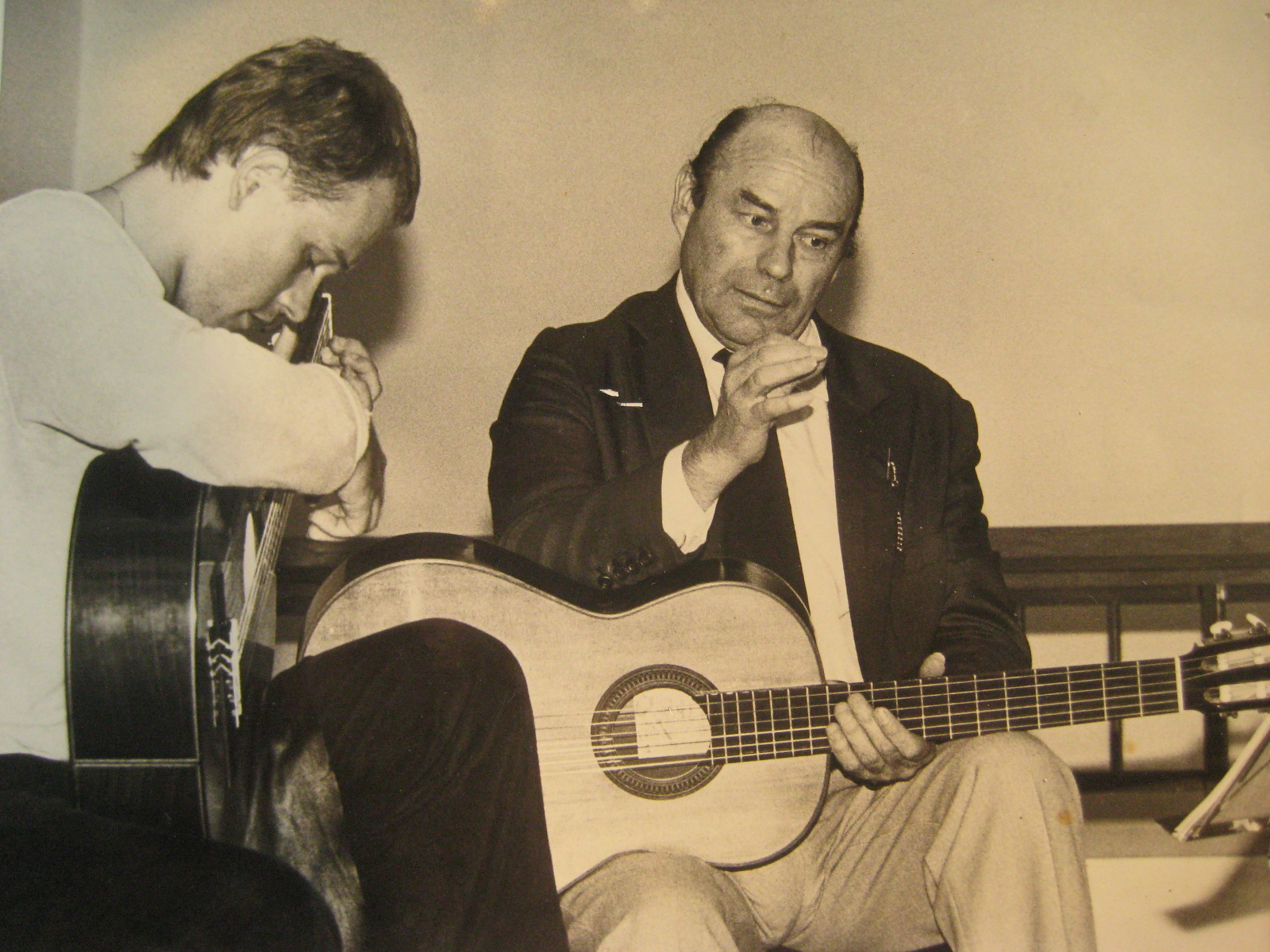
Leon Koudelak and Julian Bream in Liechtenstein 1985

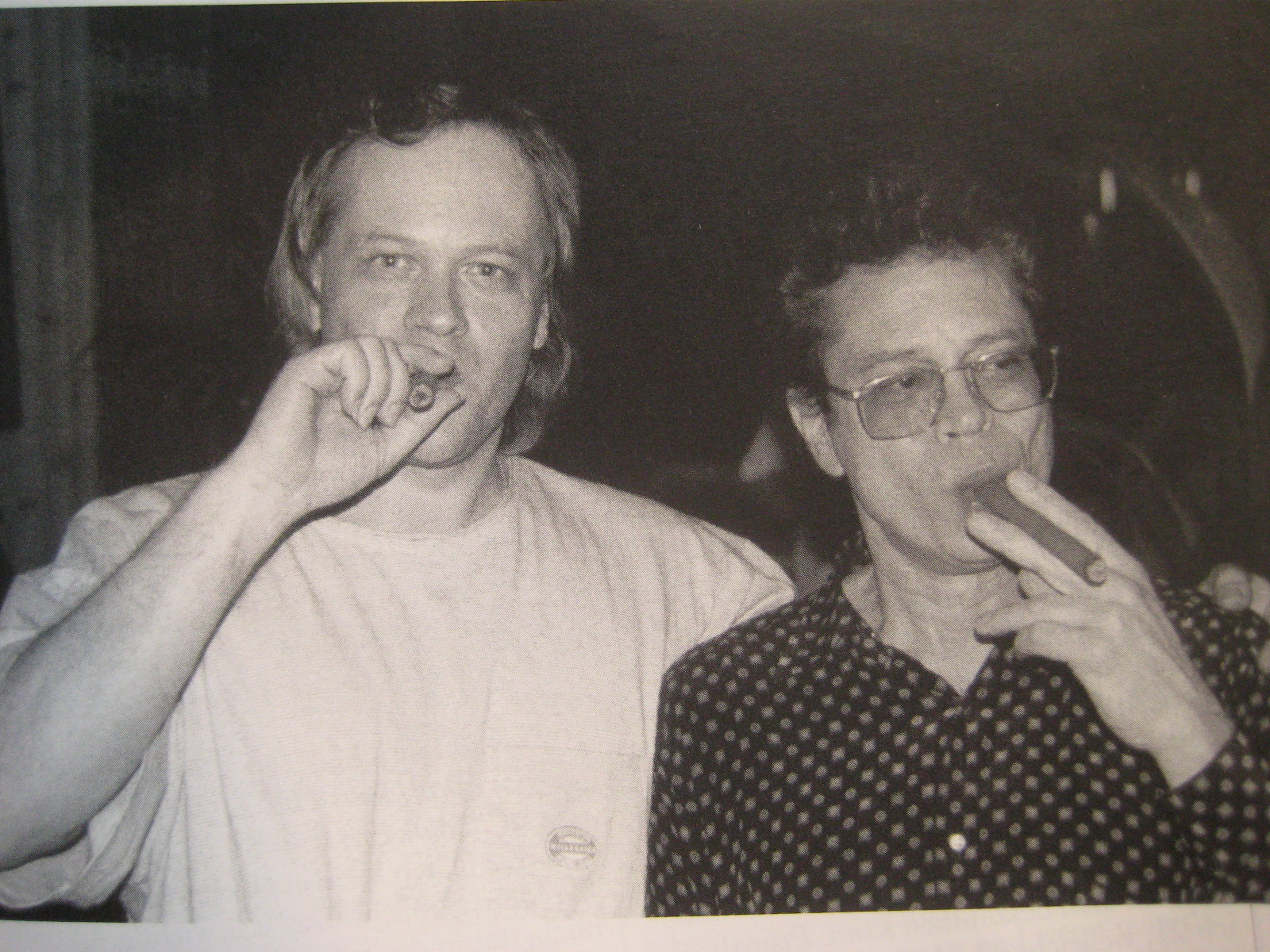
Leon Koudelak with Leo Brouwer in Havana 1998

In his teenage years, Koudalek studied with guitarists and teachers including Karl Scheit (Koudelak was one of his last students) at the University of Music and Performing Arts, Vienna, at the Zurich University of Music and Arts with Konrad Ragossnig and was one of the few students of Julian Bream in Liechtenstein l. He obtained a Bachelor's degree, a Master of Art Education degree, the Masters of Arts degree and the Magister (degree) in Vienna and Zurich . During his time in Vienna he also studied contemporary music with Roman Haubenstock-Ramati.

Koudelak lived from 1983 to 1986 in Spain, learning with flamenco guitarists the flamenco technique. In that time he became a friend of the flamenco guitarist Merenge de Cordoba. Later he changed from the apoyando technique to a combination of apoyando and sin apoyar.

Shortly after he became a prize winner of the guitar competition Fundación Jacinto e Inocencio Guerrero in Madrid, he was contacted by a Swiss concert agency with which he signed a long-year contract as well an exclusive contract with Tyrolis Music. In 1989 he recorded his first album with Tyrolis Music, Guitar Music from Spain, Mexico and Brazil, and in 1993 the CD Modern Works for Guitar. He performed at music festivals and concerts in Europe, in Germany, Great Britain, Spain, Portugal, Czechia, Slovakia, Austria, Switzerland, Italy, Belgium, the Netherlands, Hungary, France, Greece or Liechtenstein. He performed premieres in Vienna of works by the composers Roman Haubenstock-Ramati, Karlheinz Stockhausen, and Michael Buchrainer

The 1996 album Joaquin Rodrigo - Guitar Music and the 1997 Pavana Triste were released by Tyrolis Music and led him to music festivals and concert halls.

== 21st century ==
In 2001, after a concert in Bangkok, he met Woratep Rattana-umpawan and suggested that he found a guitar festival, and offered his help to make the classical guitar popular in Asia. This led to the founding of the Asia International Guitar Festival in Bangkok. After being the artistic director of the LiGiTa (Liechtensteinische Gitarren Tage) over 14 years, Koudelak start to work at the same position in Bangkok for the Asia International Guitar Festival in 2001. In the same year, he recorded in a music studio in Bangkok the CD Exotic Fruits, which was released 2002 by Tyrolis Music and became the CD of the year by the French technical periodical Les Cahiers de la Guitar.

In 2002, he led the premiere of the guitar concert "Evasion 2002 – "Eschner - guitar concert" by Michael Buchrainer with the "Symphony Orchestra Liechtenstein at the Music Festival of Liechtenstein (LiGiTa). In the years 2003, 2006 and 2007 he went back to Europe to perform concerts but stayed based in Asia.

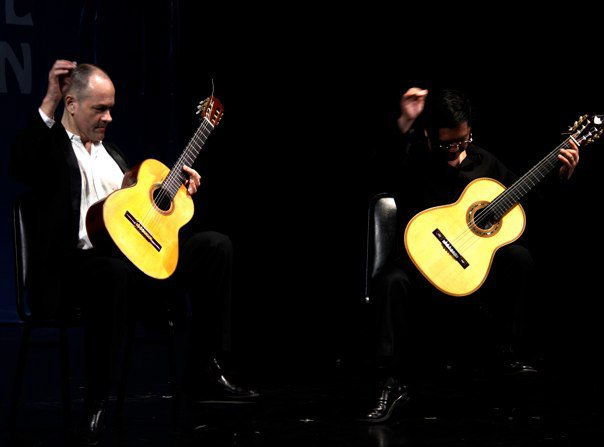
Leon Koudelak (left) with Woratep Rattana-umpawan in Manila 2011

Since end of 2005, Koudelak resides in Thailand, on an extended respite from excessively touring. He founded in 2008, together with Woratep Rattana-umpawan, the Thailand Guitar Society and teaches in Bangkok at Mahidol University (College of Music, Mahidol University) and Silpakorn University and leads his own guitar class at the Thailand Guitar Society, which is attended by students from all parts of the world, mostly from Asia (India, Arabia, Indonesia, Philippines, Thailand, Japan, Singapore, China, USA and Vietnam). In addition to being invited to play at music festivals and other music events in Asia, often with Woratep Rattana-umpawan as guitar duo, he also organizes music festivals in Thailand and acts as artistic director at the Thailand Guitar Society.

He speaks Czech, Slovak, Polish, German, Swiss German, French, English, Spanish and Thai.

In an interview in June 2012 for the Japanese guitar magazin "Homa Dream", In August 2012, Koudelak agreed to cooperate with the Indonesia Guitar Society and was appointed as chairman of the steering committee of the Indonesia International Guitar Festival & Competition. Furthermore, he was included in February 2013, as a member of the Honour Committee for the Tirana International Guitar Festival & Competition (Albania).

His 2013 Europe concert tour started in Brussels at the Brussels International Guitar Festival on 26 April 2013 and ended at the Tirana International Guitar Festival on 25 May 2013.

A concert tour in Asia followed from June until December 2013 with confirmed dates in Bangkok, Jakarta, Tokyo, Kathmandu and Singapore.

Since 2013, Leon Koudelak performs regularly in Europe and Asia and was invited to prestigious guitar festivals like Iserlohn Guitar Symposium in Germany, Forum Gitarre Vienna in Austria, Liechtensteiner Gitarren Tage, Liechtenstein, Moisycos International Music Festival, Italy, Hibernal de Chitara, Bucharest, Romania, Asia International Guitar Festival, Bangkok, Thailand, Pattaya Classical Guitar Festival, Thailand, Indonesia International Guitar Festival, Jakarta, Indonesia, Kathmandu International Guitar Festival, Nepal, Calcutta International Guitar Festival, India, Delhi International Guitar Festival. India.

== Partial retirement ==
After nearly 50 years of concert activity and over 40 years as an organizer and director of guitar festivals, Leon Koudelak announced during the Asia International Guitar Festival in Bangkok in September 2024 that he would partially retired from organizing events and reduce his concert activity, but would continue to teach classical guitar and would remain artistic director at the Thailand Guitar Society.

== Honours, awards and achievements ==
Koudelak is a prize winner of the guitar competition "Fundación Jacinto e Inocencio Guerrero" in Madrid, and received for his artistic performances the Appreciation Award from the Ministry of Education, Arts and Culture.

The CD Exotic Fruits, released in 2002 by Tyrolis Music was awarded as "the best CD of the year" by French Technical Periodical "Les Cahiers de la Guitare".

In August 2012, Koudelak was appointed as chairman of the steering committee of the Indonesia International Guitar Festival & Competition. and became 2013 member of the honours committee for the Tirana International Guitar Festival Competition.

Founder of

Liechtensteiner Gitarrenzirkel

Liechtensteiner Gitarrentage (LiGiTa)

Thailand Guitar Society

Asia International Guitar Festival, Bangkok

Pattaya Classical Guitar Festival & Competition

Guitar Award

Co founder

Kathmandu International Classical Guitar Festival

Tirana International Guitar Festival

Indonesia International Guitar Festival and Competition

== Discography ==
Koudelak has an exclusive contract with Tyrolis Music, with whom he has recorded and released eight CDs so far.

- 1989 Music from Spain, Mexico and Brazil
- 1993 Modern Works for Guitar
- 1996 Joaquin Rodrigo - Guitar Music
- 1997 Pavana Triste
- 2002 Exotic Fruits
- 2005 Leon Koudelak "best of"
- 2011 Live in Seoul
- 2011 Pavana Triste (Album new edition)

He recorded works by Johann Sebastian Bach, Robert de Visée, Dionisio Aguado, Anton Diabelli, Lennox Berkeley, Michael Buchrainer, Antonio José, Maurice Ravel, Isaac Albéniz, Enrique Granados, Joaquin Rodrigo, Joaquin Turina, Carlo Domeniconi, Manuel Maria Ponce, Heitor Villa-Lobos, Roland Dyens, Francisco Tarrega, Jon Lord, David Coverdale, Glenn Hughes, Leo Brouwer, Eduardo Martin, Edin Solis and others.

== DVD ==
The DVD Leon Koudelak: "Live in Seoul" was released 2008 by the Thailand Guitar Society.

- currently only available in Asia.

The DVD Leon Koudelak: Live in Seoul, in a remastered "10th Year's Anniversary Edition", was released by Tyrolis Classic in February 2011.

On his world tour 2001, a concert in Seoul was recorded and broadcast worldwide by Arirang TV.

In 2017 the DVD "Live in Korea 2016" was published with works by Johann Sebastian Bach, Eduardo Martin, Enrique Granados, Heitor Villa-Lobos, Carlo Domeniconi, Thomas James Pegram and Cees Hartog. youtube channel
