= Pancha Ratha =

Pancha Ratha or Pancharatha (lit. 'Five Chariots' in Sanskrit) may refer to:

- Pancharatha, a type of Hindu temple
- Pancha Rathas, a rock-cut site located at Mahabalipuram, India
- Shurasena, known by the title Pancharatha, a king in Hindu mythology

== See also ==
- Pancha (disambiguation)
- Ratha, type of Indian chariot
- Ratha (architecture), a facet of a Hindu temple architecture
- Pancharatna (disambiguation)
