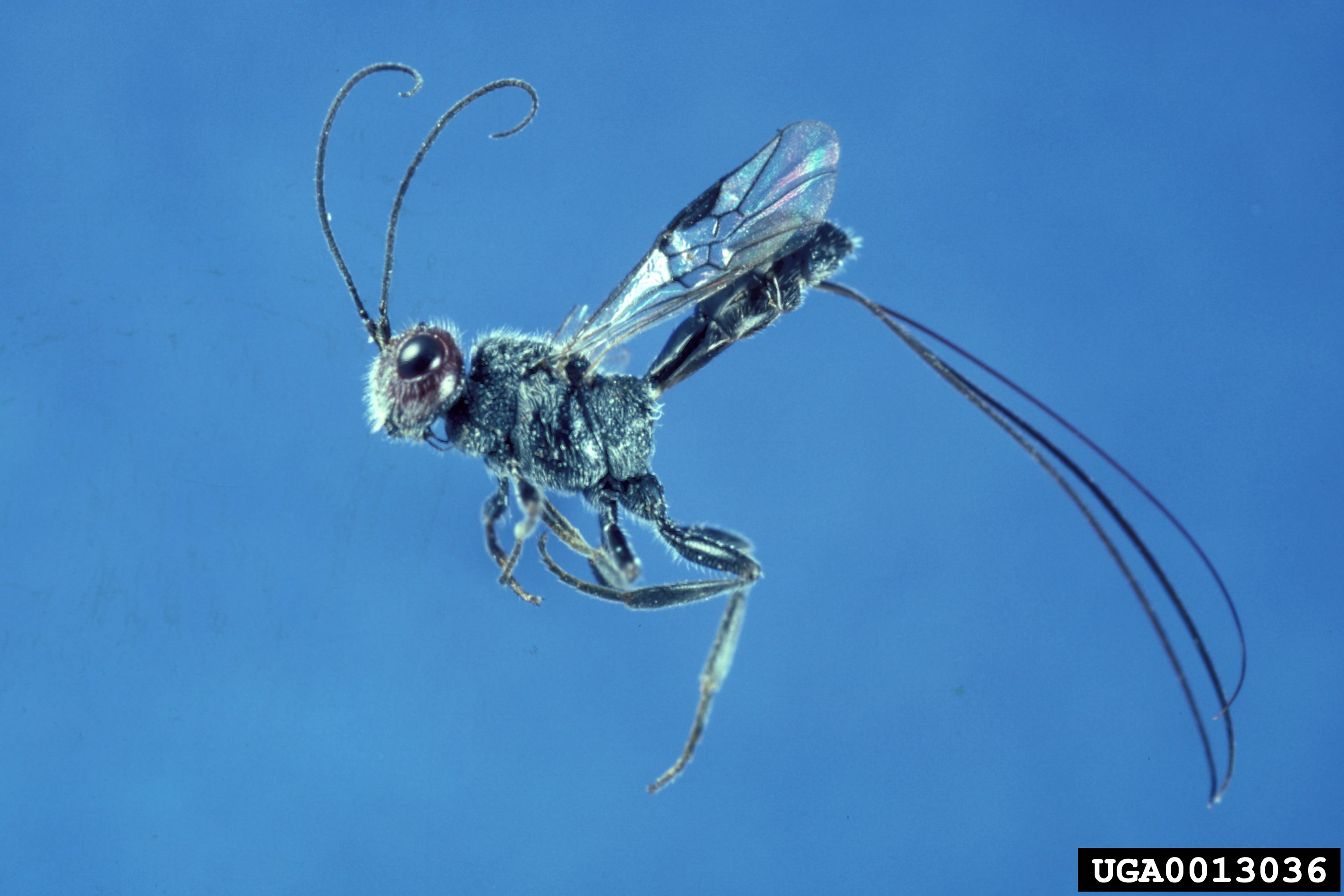
- Cenocoelius nigrisoma

Scientific classification
- Domain: Eukaryota
- Kingdom: Animalia
- Phylum: Arthropoda
- Class: Insecta
- Order: Hymenoptera
- Family: Braconidae
- Subfamily: Cenocoeliinae
- Genus: Cenocoelius; Westwood, 1840

Species include
- C. aartseni C. analis C. ashmeadii C. californicus C. caryae C. erythrogastra C. floridanus C. huggerti C. nigrisoma C. nigriventris C. quadratus C. sanguineiventris C. saperdae C. tenuicornis...

= Cenocoelius =

Genus of wasps

Cenocoelius is a genus of hymenopteran insects belonging to the family Braconidae. Those species whose life history has been studied are all koinobiont parasitoids on wood-boring beetle larvae (mainly Cerambycidae and Curculionidae but sometimes Buprestidae).
