= Rangula Ratnam =

Rangula Ratnam may refer to:

- Rangula Ratnam (1966 film), a 1966 Telugu film
- Rangula Ratnam (2018 film), a 2018 Telugu film

== See also ==
- Ratnam (disambiguation)
