= Rangsit University =

University in Thailand

Coordinates: 13°57′53.55″N 100°35′11.26″E

- มหาวิทยาลัยรังสิต
- Motto: สร้างสรรค์สิ่งที่ดีให้แก่สังคม; Creating the best for society.
- Type: Private
- Established: 1990 (1986, as Rangsit College)
- Affiliations: ASAIHL
- President: Arthit Ourairat
- Location: Mueang Pathum Thani, Pathum Thani (Greater Bangkok), Thailand
- Colors: Blue and deep pink
- Nickname: RSU
- Mascot: Tiger
- Website: www2.rsu.ac.th/home

Rangsit University (RSU; Thai: มหาวิทยาลัยรังสิต) is a private university in Pathum Thani, Thailand, focusing mainly on music, design, Information technology, and public health including independent professions.

RSU is fully accredited by the Thai government's Commission on Higher Education of the Ministry of Education. The main campus occupies a 296 rai (47.4 ha; 117 acres) site in the Lak-Hok sub-district of Mueang Pathum Thani District, Pathum Thani Province. Rangsit University is the only private university assessed for quality by the Office for National Education Standards and Quality Assessment that is rated "very good" among institutions focused on graduate education.

== Colleges and Faculties ==
As of 2018 RSU offers 141 programs: 94 undergraduate programs, 37 master's degree programs, one graduate diploma, and nine doctoral degree programs.

(*includes graduate schools.)

=== Colleges ===
- College of Medicine
- College of Oriental Medicine*
- College of Biomedical Engineering*
- College of Engineering*
- College of Government *
- College of Social Innovation*
- College of Information Technology*
- Conservatory of Music*
- College of International*
- College of Communication Arts*
- College of Tourism and Hospitality*
- College of Agricultural innovation, Biotechnology and Food
- Aviation Institute

=== Faculties ===
- Faculty of Dentistry
- Faculty of Nursing Science
- Faculty of Pharmacy*
- Faculty of Radiological Technology
- Faculty of Medical Technology
- Faculty of Physical Therapy
- Faculty of Optometry
- Faculty of Science
- Faculty of Architecture
- Faculty of Art and Design
- Faculty of Digital Art*
- Faculty of Political Science *
- Faculty of Liberal Arts*
- Faculty of Law*
- Faculty of Education*
- Faculty of Business Administration
- Faculty of Accounting*
- Faculty of Economics
- Institute of Criminology
- Institute of Diplomacy and International Studies
- Institute of Public Administration

== Reception ==
Out of more than 300 universities and colleges in Thailand, Rangsit is placed by many independent academic rankings in the top 50. EduRank ranks the university top in Pathum Thani, 17th in Thailand, and 3,060th in the world in 2020. Webometric Ranking of World Universities puts Rangsit at 20th in Thailand and 2,448th in the world.

== Presidents ==
- Arthit Ourairat 1986-1991
- Arthon Chonhenchop 1991-1992
- Subseang Phrombun 1992-1994
- Suphan Phuphaka 1994-2001
- Arthit Ourairat 2001-2022
- Attawit Ourairat 2022-2025
- Arthit Ourairat 2025-present

== Rangsit University's song ==
This is the theme song of the institute of Rangsit University, used in various university activities:

- Rangsit University March (เพลงมาร์ชมหาวิทยาลัยรังสิต)
- Tawan Rung Thung Rangsit (เพลงตะวันรุ่งทุ่งรังสิต)
- Blue Dream (เพลงฟ้าฝันบานเย็น)
- Mon Rangsit (เพลงมนต์รังสิต)
- Sri Rangsit (เพลงศรีรังสิต)
- Rak Rungsit (Rangsit Love) (เพลงรักรังสิต)
- RSU Blue Fuchsia (เพลง RSU บลูบานเย็น)
- Goodbye, goodbye evening (เพลงลาแล้วลาบานเย็นฟ้า)
- United in Architecture (เพลงรวมใจสถาปัตย์)
- Panithan, Rangsit Nurse (เพลงปณิธาน พยาบาลรังสิต)
- Communication Arts's Theme (เพลงนิเทศศาสตร์)
- Chalermnam Rangsit Graduate School (เพลงเฉลิมนามรังสิต บัณฑิตสถาน)

=== Other ===
It is another song used in various university activities.

- You are Raise Me Up
- Peng Neung (Song of "The Sun Games 2020" event hosted by Rangsit University)
- RSU FC (Football club's song of Rangsit University)
- Shall We Dance? (Previously, this song was used to perform songs at graduation ceremonies. But now it has been discontinued.)
- Eternally (Previously, this song was used to honor the president at the graduation ceremony. But now it's used as the song Pomp and Circumstance instead.)
