= Ratan (disambiguation) =

Ratan may refer to:

- Rattan, name for different species of plants
- Rätan, locality in Sweden
- RATAN-600, Russian radio telescope

== See also ==
- Ratna (disambiguation)
- Rattan (disambiguation)
- Rattana (disambiguation)
- Ratan Lal Sharma, a fictional character in the 1992 Indian film Jo Jeeta Wohi Sikandar, played by Mamik Singh
