= Ratnakar =

Ratnakar or Rathnakar is an Indian name derived from Sanskrit Ratna.

- Ratnakar, Sanskrit term for ocean or sea, specifically the Indian Ocean
- Ratnākara (9th century CE), Sanskrit poet
- Rathnakar (actor), Indian actor
- Ratnākaraśānti (10th to mid 11th century CE), Buddhist philosopher
- Kimmane Rathnakar, Indian politician from Karnataka
- Ratnakar Matkari (born 1938), Marathi writer
- Ratnakar Pai (1928–2009), Hindustani classical music vocalist of the Jaipur-Atrauli Gharana
- Ratnakar Pandey, a politician from India
- Ratnakar Bank, a scheduled commercial bank in Maharashtra
- Sangita Ratnakara, 13th century musicological text
- Dashyu Ratnakar, a 1962 Ollywood/Oriya film directed by Prabhat Mukherjee Dasyu Ratnakar
- Ratnakar (2019 film), a 2019 Assamese-language film by Jatin Bora

== See also ==
- Ratna (disambiguation)
- Kar (disambiguation)
