= Madineni Venkat Ratnam =

Indian atmospheric scientist

- Born: 21 January 1973 (age 53); Armoor, Nizamabad district, Andhra Pradesh, India
- Education: Kakatiya Residential College, Nizamabad. Girriraj Government Degree College, Nizamabad. Osmania University; Sri Venkateswara University
- Known for: Studies on Middle Atmospheric Structure and Dynamics
- Awards: 2018 Shanti Swarup Bhatnagar Prize for Science and Technology; 2010 NASI-SCOPUS Young Scientist Award
- Scientific career
- Fields: Atmospheric science
- Workplaces: National Atmospheric Research Laboratory
- Doctoral advisor: D. Narayana Rao

Madineni Venkat Ratnam (born 1973) is an Indian atmospheric scientist, Heading Aerosol, Radiation and Trace gases Group at the National Atmospheric Research Laboratory of Department of Space, Government of India. He is known for his studies on middle atmospheric structure and dynamics.

== Early life and education ==
Born on 21 January 1973, at Armoor in Nizamabad district of the south Indian state of Andhra Pradesh to Madineni Ramayya and Madineni Aademma.

== Career ==
He has published a number of articles; (Note: Please see Selected bibliography section) ResearchGate, an online repository of scientific articles has listed 182 of them. The Council of Scientific and Industrial Research, the apex agency of the Government of India for scientific research, awarded him the Shanti Swarup Bhatnagar Prize for Science and Technology, one of the highest Indian science awards, for his contributions to Earth, Atmosphere, Ocean and Planetary Sciences in 2018. (Note: Long link - please select award year to see details)

== Selected bibliography ==
- Hima Bindu, H.; Venkat Ratnam, M.; Yesubabu, Viswanadhapalli; Hari Prasad, D. (1 January 2019). "Medium frequency gravity wave characteristics obtained using Weather Research and Forecasting (WRF) model simulations". Journal of Atmospheric and Solar-Terrestrial Physics. 182: 119–129. Bibcode:2019JASTP.182..119H. doi:10.1016/j.jastp.2018.11.013. hdl:10754/630201. ISSN 1364-6826. S2CID 125471680.
- Das, Siddarth Shankar; Suneeth, K. V.; Ratnam, M. Venkat; Girach, I. A.; Das, Subrata Kumar (27 August 2018). "Upper tropospheric ozone transport from the sub-tropics to tropics over the Indian region during Asian summer monsoon". Climate Dynamics. 52 (7–8): 4567–4581. doi:10.1007/s00382-018-4418-6. ISSN 1432-0894. S2CID 133685815.
- Emmanuel, Maria; Sunilkumar, S. V.; Venkat Ratnam, M.; Muhsin, M.; Parameswaran, K.; Krishna Murthy, B. V. (1 November 2018). "Diurnal variation of the tropospheric water vapour over a coastal and an inland station in Southern Indian Peninsula". Journal of Atmospheric and Solar-Terrestrial Physics. 179: 11–21. Bibcode:2018JASTP.179...11E. doi:10.1016/j.jastp.2018.06.007. ISSN 1364-6826. S2CID 126401388.
- Basha, Ghouse; Kishore, P.; Ratnam, M. Venkat; Ravindra Babu, S.; Velicogna, Isabella; Jiang, Jonathan H.; Ao, Chi O. (24 May 2018). "Global climatology of planetary boundary layer top obtained from multi-satellite GPS RO observations". Climate Dynamics. 52 (3–4): 2385–2398. doi:10.1007/s00382-018-4269-1. ISSN 1432-0894. S2CID 134124067.
- Eswaraiah, S.; Venkata Chalapathi, G.; Niranjan Kumar, K.; Venkat Ratnam, M.; Kim, Yong Ha; Vishnu Prasanth, P.; Lee, Jaewook; Rao, S. V. B. (1 April 2018). "A case study of convectively generated gravity waves coupling of the lower atmosphere and mesosphere-lower thermosphere (MLT) over the tropical region: An observational evidence". Journal of Atmospheric and Solar-Terrestrial Physics. 169: 45–51. Bibcode:2018JASTP.169...45E. doi:10.1016/j.jastp.2018.01.005. ISSN 1364-6826.

== See also ==
- Atmosphere of Earth
- Gravitational wave
