= Rathna =

Rathna may refer to:

- Rathna (film), a 1998 Tamil language film
- Rathna (actress) (born 1948), Indian actress

== See also ==
- Ratna (disambiguation)
