= Shyam Ray Temple =

- শ্যামরায় মন্দির
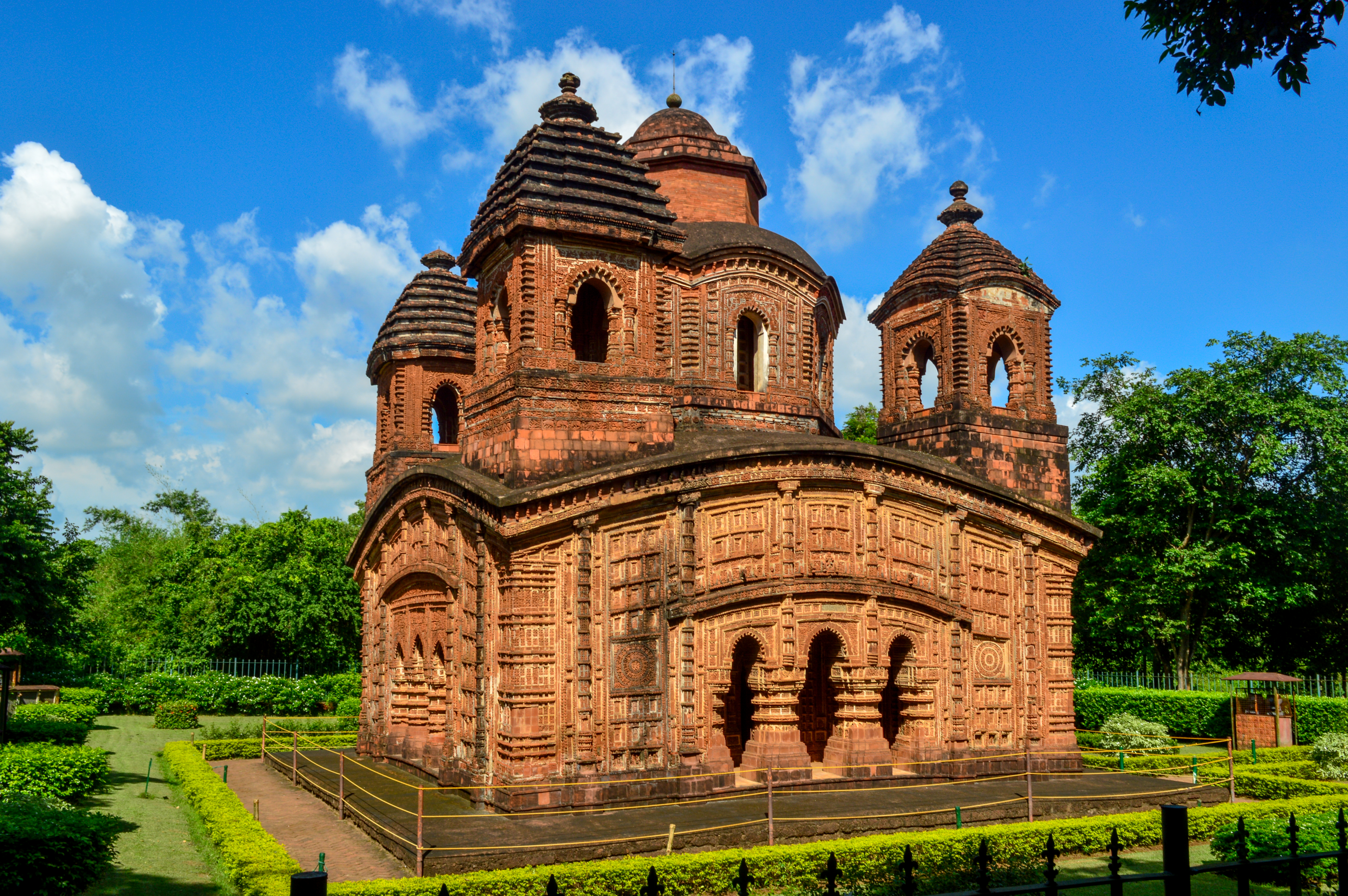

Religion
- Affiliation: Hinduism
- District: Bankura
- Deity: Shyam Ray

Location
- Location: Bishnupur
- State: West Bengal
- Country: India
- Interactive map of Shyam Ray Temple
- Coordinates: 23°4′16″N 87°19′27″E

Architecture
- Type: Bengal temple architecture
- Style: Pancha-ratna style
- Founder: Raghunath Singha
- Established: 1643; 383 years ago

Specifications
- Direction of façade: South
- Length: 11.4 m (37 ft)
- Width: 11.4 m (37 ft)
- Height (max): 10.7 m (35 ft)
- Monument of National Importance
- Official name: Shyam Rai Temple
- Type: Cultural
- Reference no.: IN-WB-25

Shyam Ray Temple (Śyāma rāẏa mandira) also known as Pancha-ratna temple, is a Krishna temple in Bishnupur town of Bankura district, Medinipur division in Indian state of West Bengal. In this temple, the Hindu God Krishna is worshiped in the form of Shyam; along with Shyam, the murti of Radhika (Radha) is also worshipped.

== History and architecture ==
According to the foundation plaque found in the temple, the temple was founded in 1643 by King Raghunath Singha of Mallabhum. The Temple is built in the Pancha-ratna temple architecture, which belongs to the ratna style developed in medieval Bengal.

The roof of this temple is square and curved, with curved edges and five chura or shikhar (tower). The temple is known for its ornamentation, which adorns the exterior and interior of the walls surrounding this temple. The ornaments are primarily placed on terracotta plaques set into the walls. The walls of the temple are decorated with beautiful floral designs, scenes of Krishna-lila, episodes from Puranic literature, designs of geometric and floral patterns, and scenes of the Ramayana and the Mahabharata.

Currently, it is preserved as one of the archaeological monuments by the Archaeological Survey of India. Since 1998, the Shyam Ray temple is on the UNESCO World Heritage Site's Tentative list.

== Gallery ==
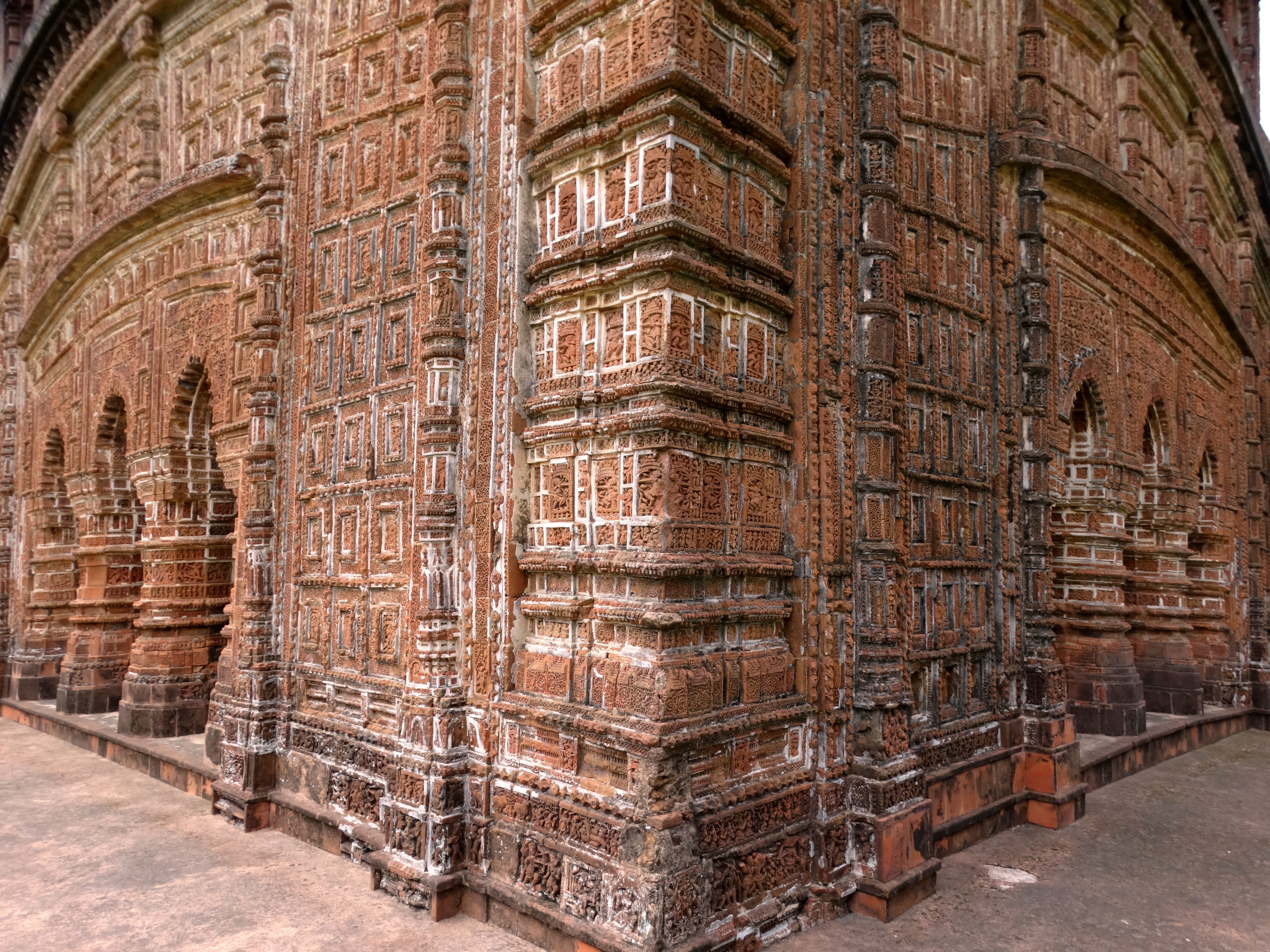

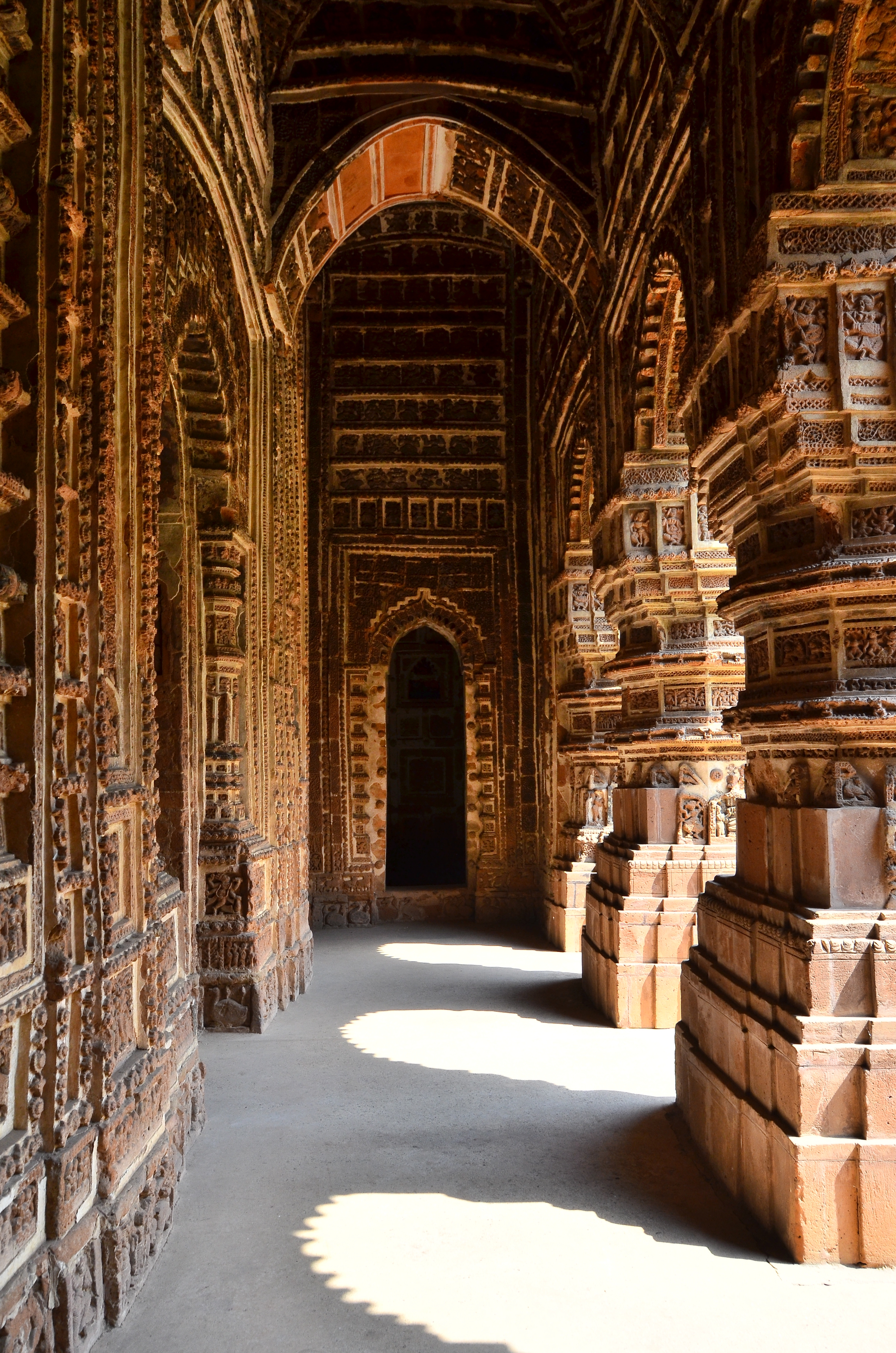

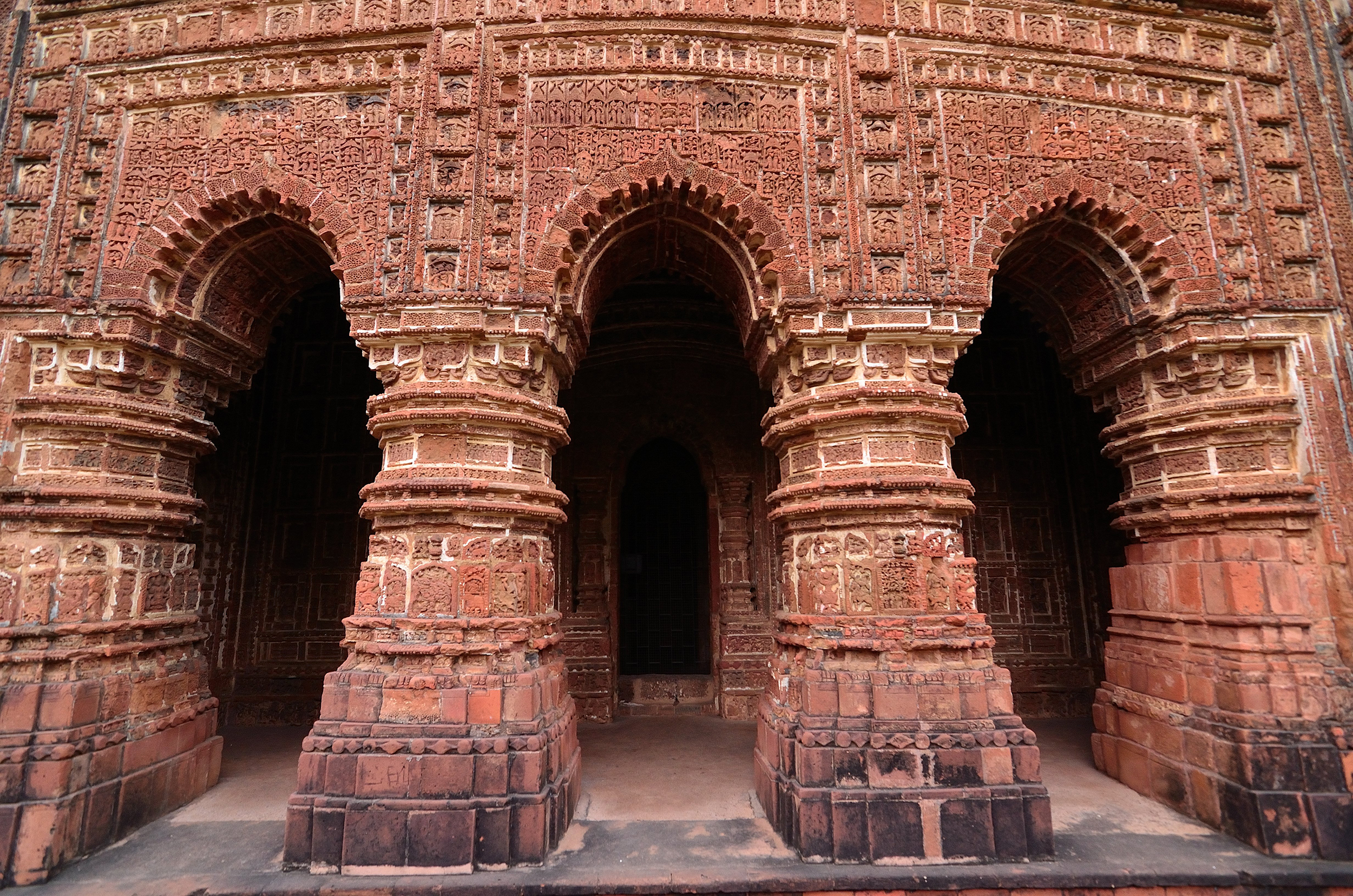

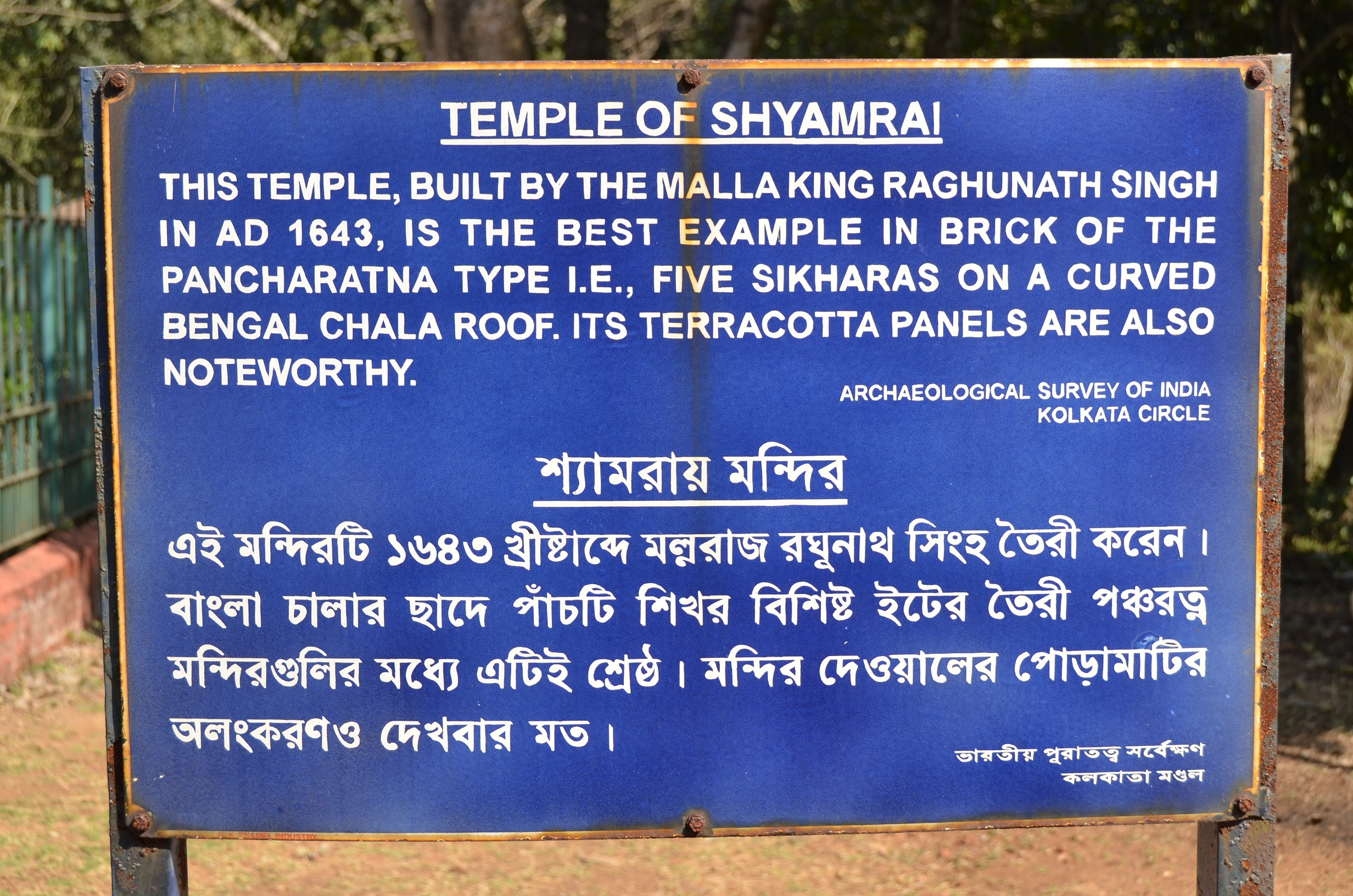

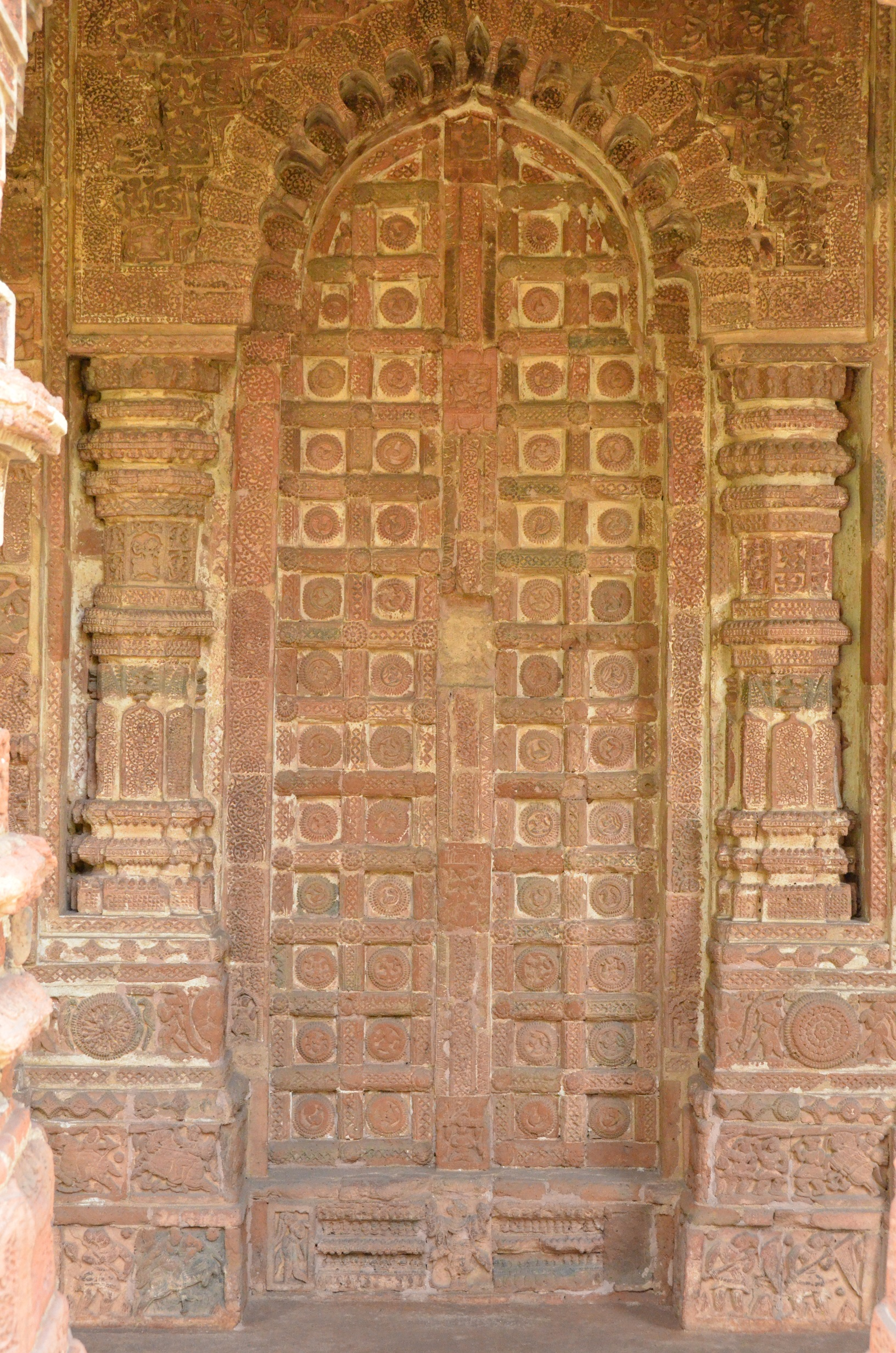

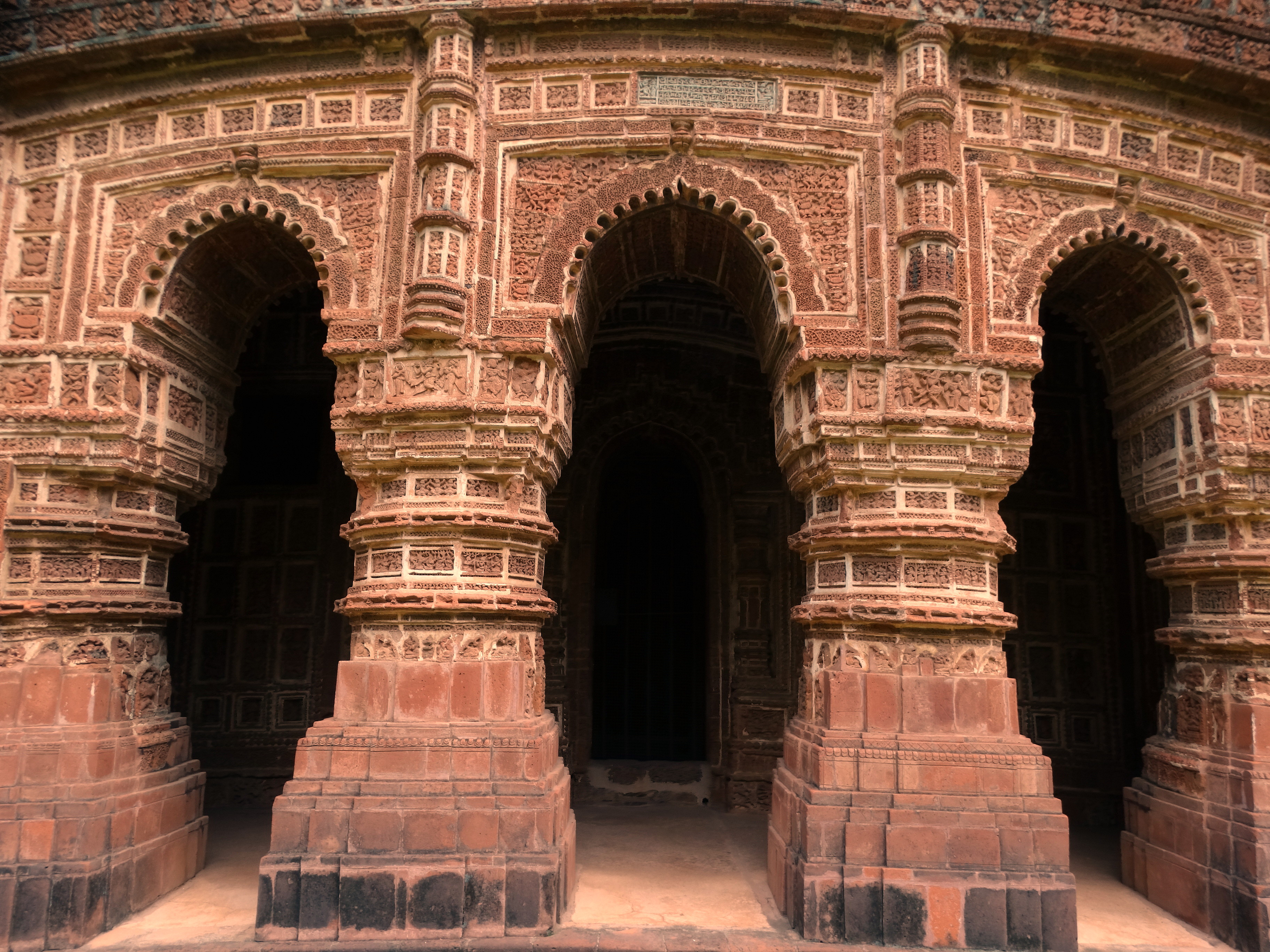

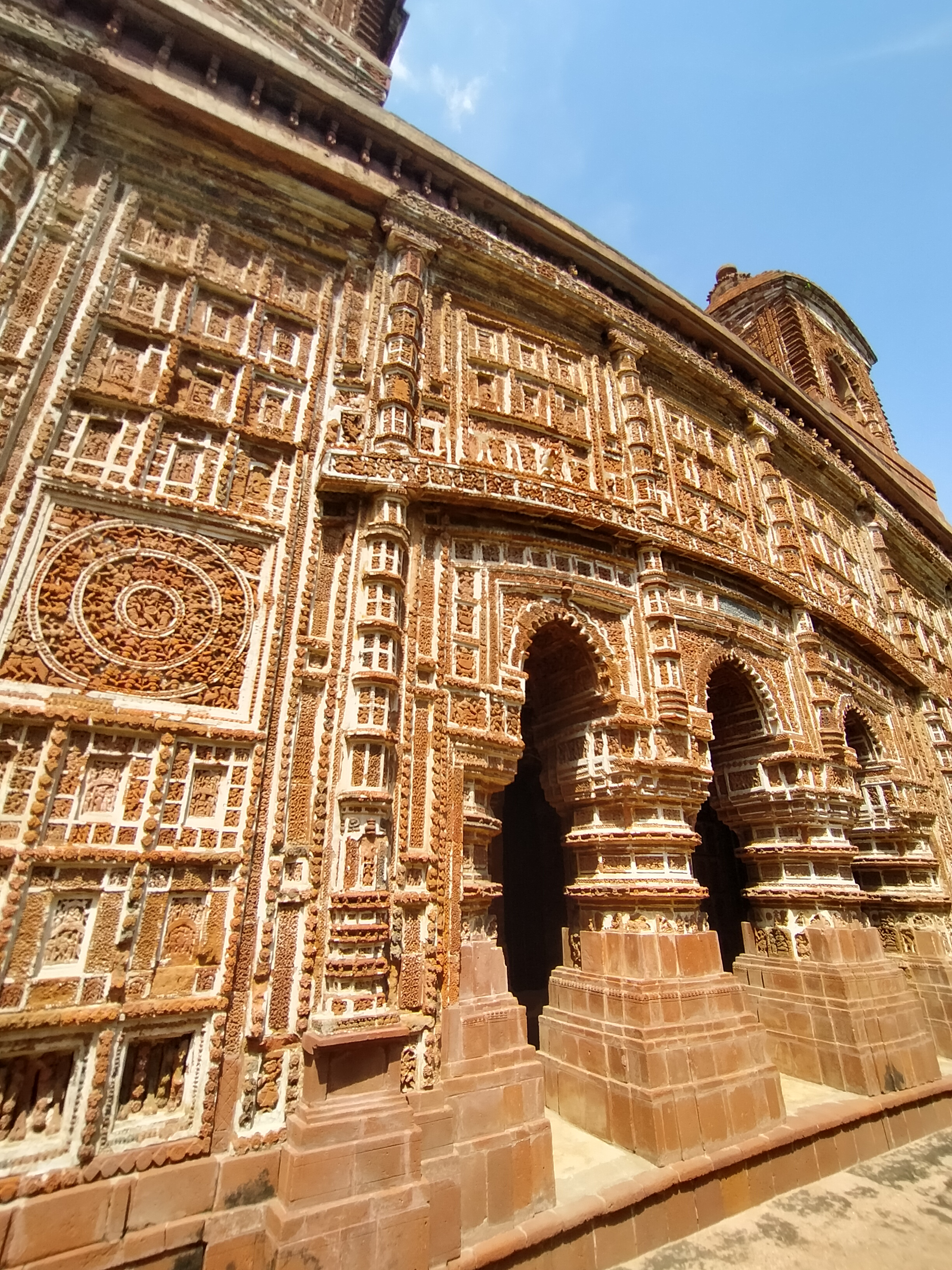

== Sources ==
- Biswas, S. S. (1992). "The Temples". Bishnupur (2nd ed.). New Delhi: Archaeological Survey of India.
