= Conservatory of Music, Rangsit University =

Thai music school

Conservatory of Music Rangsit University
- Motto: Making the impossible possible
- Type: Private
- Established: 2002
- Parent institution: Rangsit University
- Dean: Denny Euprasert
- Students: 200
- Undergraduates: 160
- Postgraduates: 40
- Location: Mueang Pathum Thani, Pathum Thani (Greater Bangkok), Thailand
- Campus: Urban
- Website: www.rsu.ac.th/music

The Conservatory of Music, Rangsit University or Wittayalaidontri (Thai: วิทยาลัยดนตรี; literally: College of Music) is the third music school in Thailand, after Duliyangkasilp College, and Khanaduriyangkasart. It was established in 2002 by Arthit Ourairat, President of Rangsit University.

Wittayalaidontri focuses solely on Western music, especially classical, contemporary and popular music. Wittayalaidontri does not offer Thai traditional music courses.

== History ==
Prior to the conservatory, a student in Rangsit University could study music as an optional course at the Institute of Cultural Affairs, with Tanet Sriwong and Suwiwat Thitiwattanarat as their teachers.

The conservatory was established in 2002. Ourairat invited Srikaranonda to act as a temporary dean, while Euprasert, a doctoral student at University of Northern Colorado, had already filled the role.

Initial courses included Composition, Jazz, Performance and Music Production. In 2007, the conservatory began offering classes in music therapy and music business. However, no students enrolled in these courses. In 2009, Boonrut Sirirattanapan offered a course in scoring for film and multimedia.

Ten students each year are awarded the Princess of Naradhiwas scholarship.

Suryadhep Music Hall was completed in 2015. The hall contains 1,300 seats, innovative sound reflection, and a liftable stage for opera performance.

== List of deans ==
- 2002-2003: Dr. Pathorn Srikaranonda
- 2003–2017: Dr. Denny Euprasert
- 2017–2018: Dr. Wiboon Trakulhun (Acting)
- 2018–present: Dr. Denny Euprasert

== Degrees ==
- Pre-College Diploma (In cooperation with Satit Bilingual School of Rangsit University)
- Bachelor of Music (B.Mus) degree (Production, Music Engineering Technology, Sound and Media Composition, Contemporary Composition, Songwriting, Instrumental Performance, Piano Performance, Guitar Performance, Voice Performance, Jazz and Contemporary Improvised Music)
- Master of Music (M.M) degree (Music Performance and Pedagogy, Composition, Jazz Studies, Music Theory)

== Band and activity ==
- Symphony Orchestra
- Chorus
- Chamber Orchestra
- String Quartet
- Wind Ensemble
- Brass Choir
- Percussion Ensemble
- Jazz Ensemble
- Guitar Ensemble
- Opera and Musical Theatre

== Service center ==
- Music Academy
- Music Production
- Artist Management
