= Navaratnam =

Navaratnam நவரத்தினம்
- Pronunciation: Navarattiṉam
- Gender: Male
- Language: Tamil

Origin
- Meaning: Nine gems
- Region of origin: Southern India; North-eastern Sri Lanka

Navaratnam (Tamil: நவரத்தினம்) is a Tamil male given name. Due to the Tamil tradition of using patronymic surnames it may also be a surname for males and females.

== Notable people ==
=== Given name ===
- K. Navaratnam (born 1935), Sri Lankan politician
- Kumar Navaratnam, Sri Lankan musician
- Ramon Navaratnam (born 1935), Malaysian economist
- Summa Navaratnam (1925–2023), Ceylonese athlete
- Suresh Navaratnam (born 1975), Malaysian cricketer
- V. Navaratnam (1909–2006), Ceylonese politician
- V. N. Navaratnam (1929–1991), Ceylonese politician

=== Surname ===
- Rosemary Navaratnam (born 1932), Sri Lankan author
- Timothy Navaratnam Horshington (died 2002), Ceylonese broadcaster
