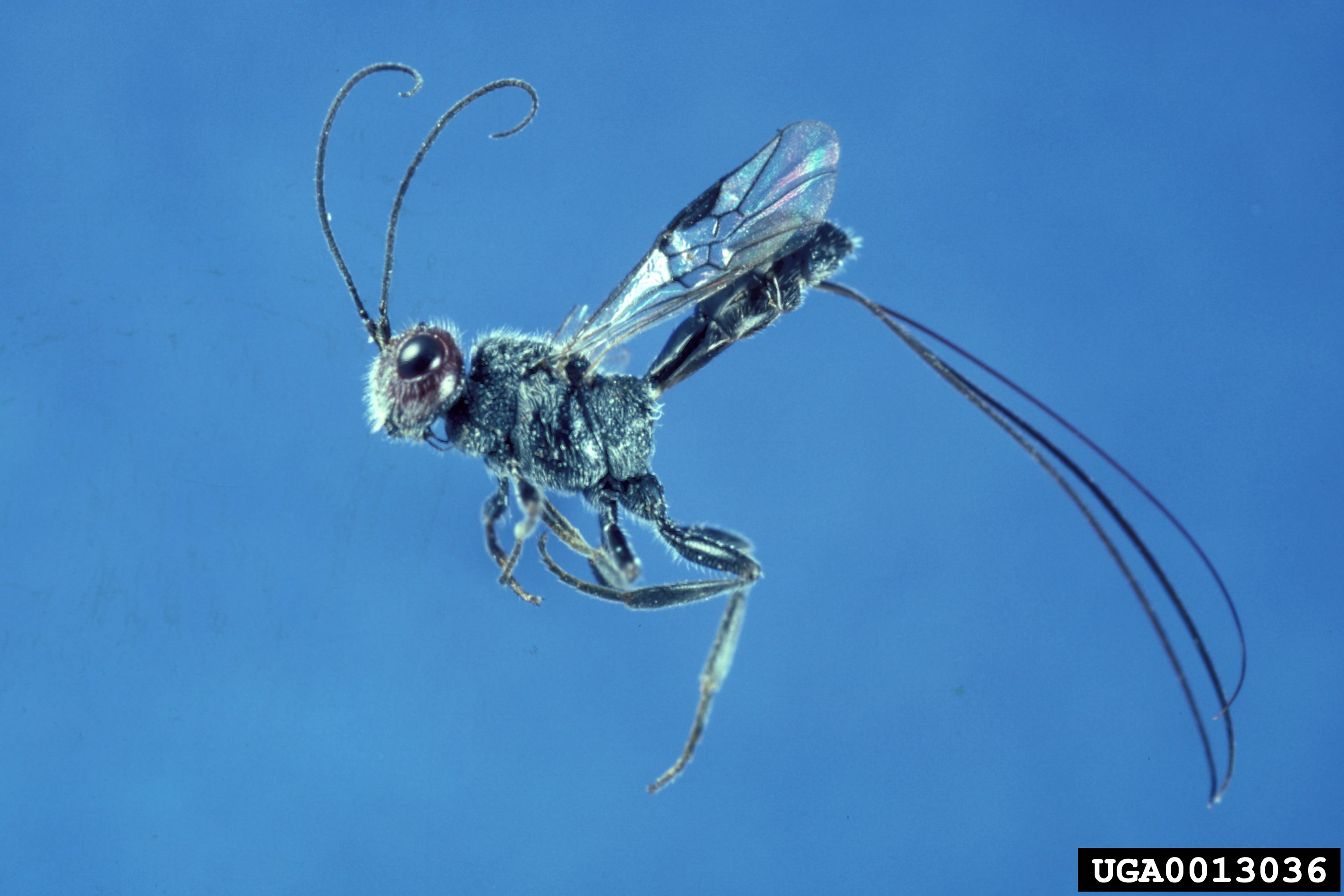

Scientific classification
- Kingdom: Animalia
- Phylum: Arthropoda
- Class: Insecta
- Order: Hymenoptera
- Family: Braconidae
- Subfamily: Cenocoeliinae; Szépligeti, 1901

= Cenocoeliinae =

Subfamily of wasps

The Cenocoeliinae are a subfamily of braconid parasitoid wasps.

== Description and distribution ==
Cenocoeliines are medium-sized braconids (3-11 mm long) with relatively large heads. The metasoma is attached high above the hind legs on the propodeum in contrast to other braconids, where the attachment is just above the hind coxa. They are non-cyclostome and females have long ovipositors. Their wings are often darkly colored.

Cenocoeliinae have a worldwide distribution, but have been only rarely found in the Afrotropical region. Most species are described from the Nearctic, but many undescribed species have been found in Neotropical regions.

== Biology ==
Little is known about Cenocoeliinae biology, but records so far indicate they are koinobiont endoparasitoids of beetle larvae feeding within plants. Hosts include members of Cerambycidae, Curculionidae, Buprestidae, and Scolytinae.

== Genera ==
Genera placed here include:

=== Tribe Cenocoeliini Szépligeti, 1901 ===
- Capitonius Brullé, 1846
- Cenocoelius Westwood, 1840
- Evaniomorpha Szépligeti, 1901
- Lestricus Reinhard, 1866
- Nuessleinia Kittel, 2016
- Hymenorattana van Achterberg, 2012

=== Tribe Ussurohelconini van Achterberg, 1994 ===
- Ussurohelcon Belokobylskij, 1989
