= Ratna style =

Style of a Hindu temple

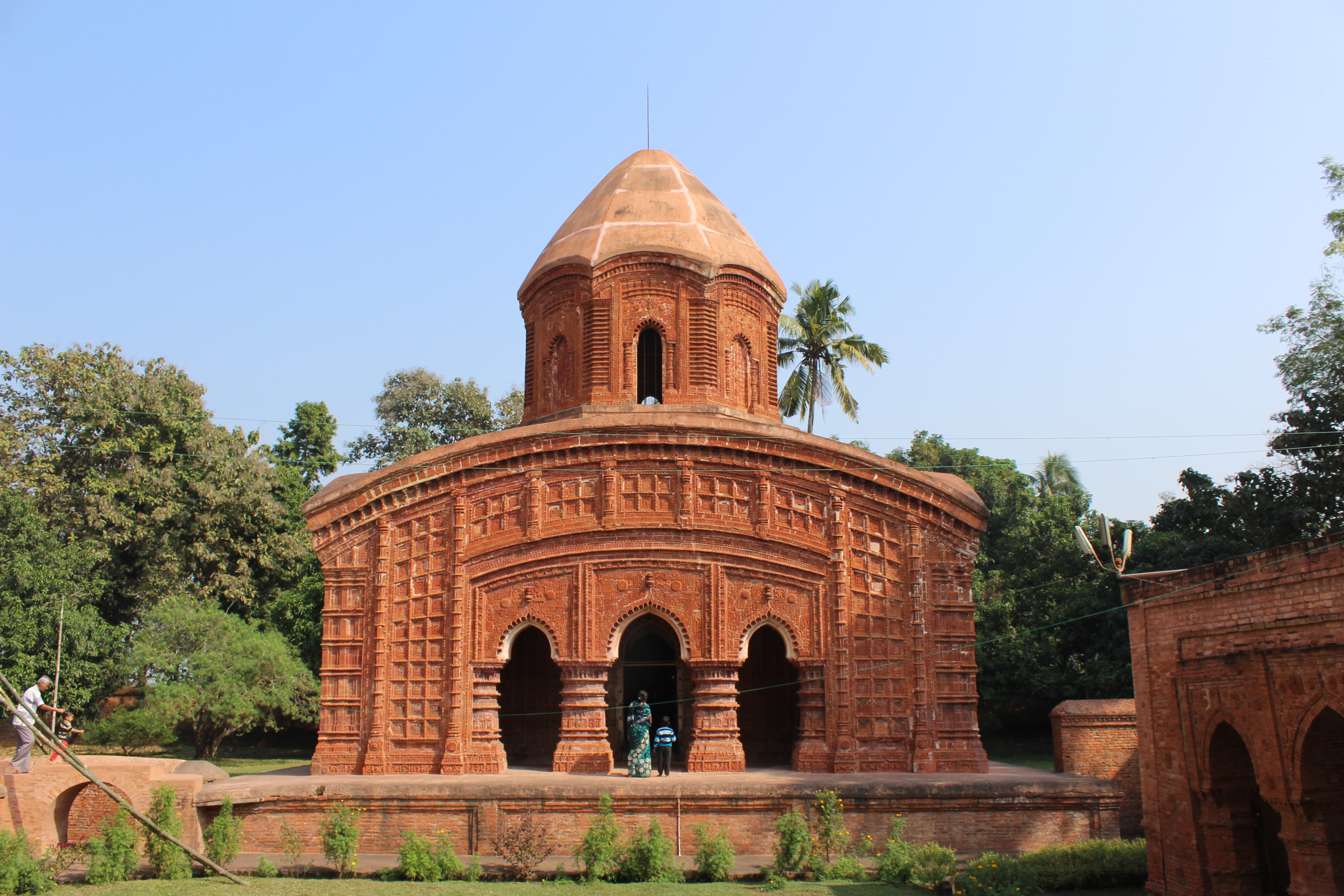
Ek-ratna Ramchandraji temple at Guptipara, Hooghly district.

Ratna Style (Bengali: রত্ন শিল্পরীতি) is a style of Bengal temple architecture, that originated in Bengal from the 15th to 16th centuries, under the Mallabhum kingdom (also called Malla dynasty). Originating as a regional style in Hindu temple architecture. It is an extended style of the Chala temple. The special feature of Ratna-style temples is the curved cornice of the chala.

Ratna-style temples were built all over Bengal. But most of the temples are found in the city of Bishnupur. In the present day, the temples are now located in two separate national territories: the Indian states of West Bengal and Tripura, and Bangladesh.

== Etymology ==
Ratna-style temples have one or more towers or pinnacles above the curved roof. These pinnacles are known as Ratna (jewel) in Bengal temple architecture. This temple architectural style derives its name from these pinnacle (ratna).

== History ==
The ratna style came up in the 15th-16th century. The first recorded Ratna style temple is the Brindabana-Chandra Temple, which was built by the Malla kings in 1638. In the 17th century, This type of temple flourished with the encouragement of the Malla kings. The temples built by the Malla kings in the 17th century are considered by researchers to be the best examples of Ratna architectural style.

== Types ==
There are different types of temples in Ratna-style. With increase in the number of storeys, the ratnas could go up to thirteen, seventeen, twenty-one, or twenty-five. 7 types of Ratna-style temples are observed as per the number of "ratnas". The three most common types are Eka-ratna, Pancha-ratna and Naba-ratna.

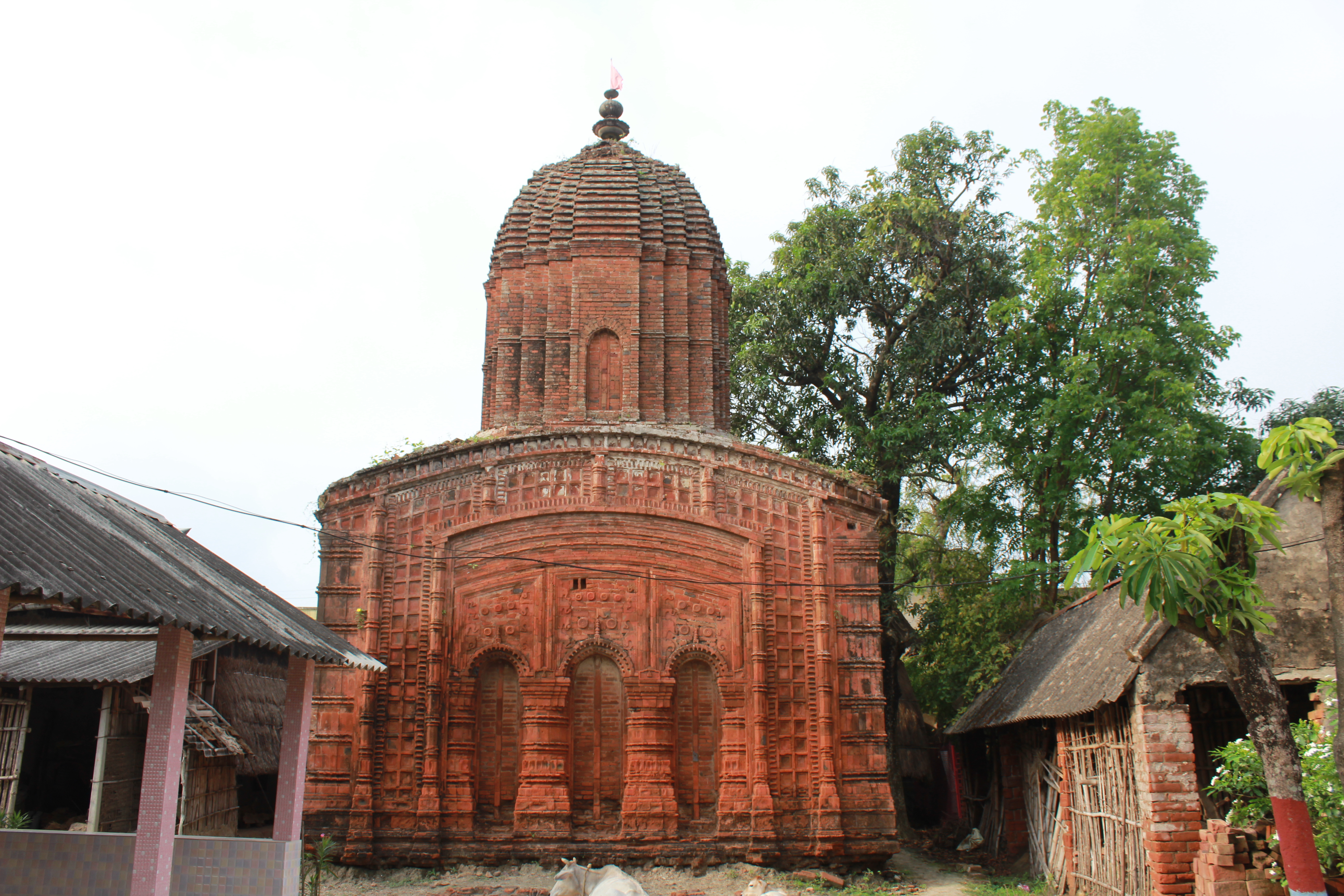
Ek-ratna Damodar temple at Kendur, Purba Bardhaman district.

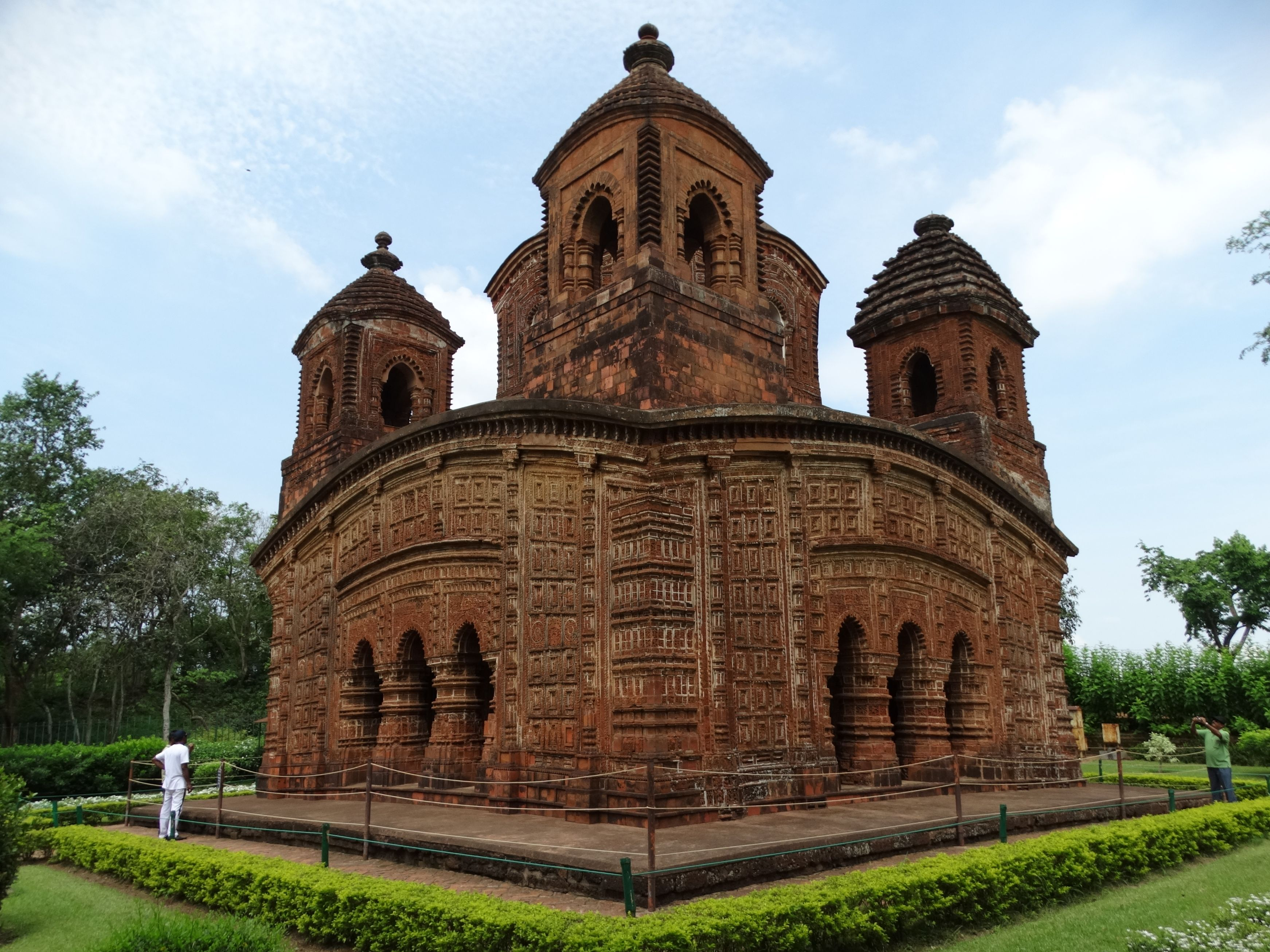
Pancha-ratna Shyamrai temple at Bishnupur, Bankura district.

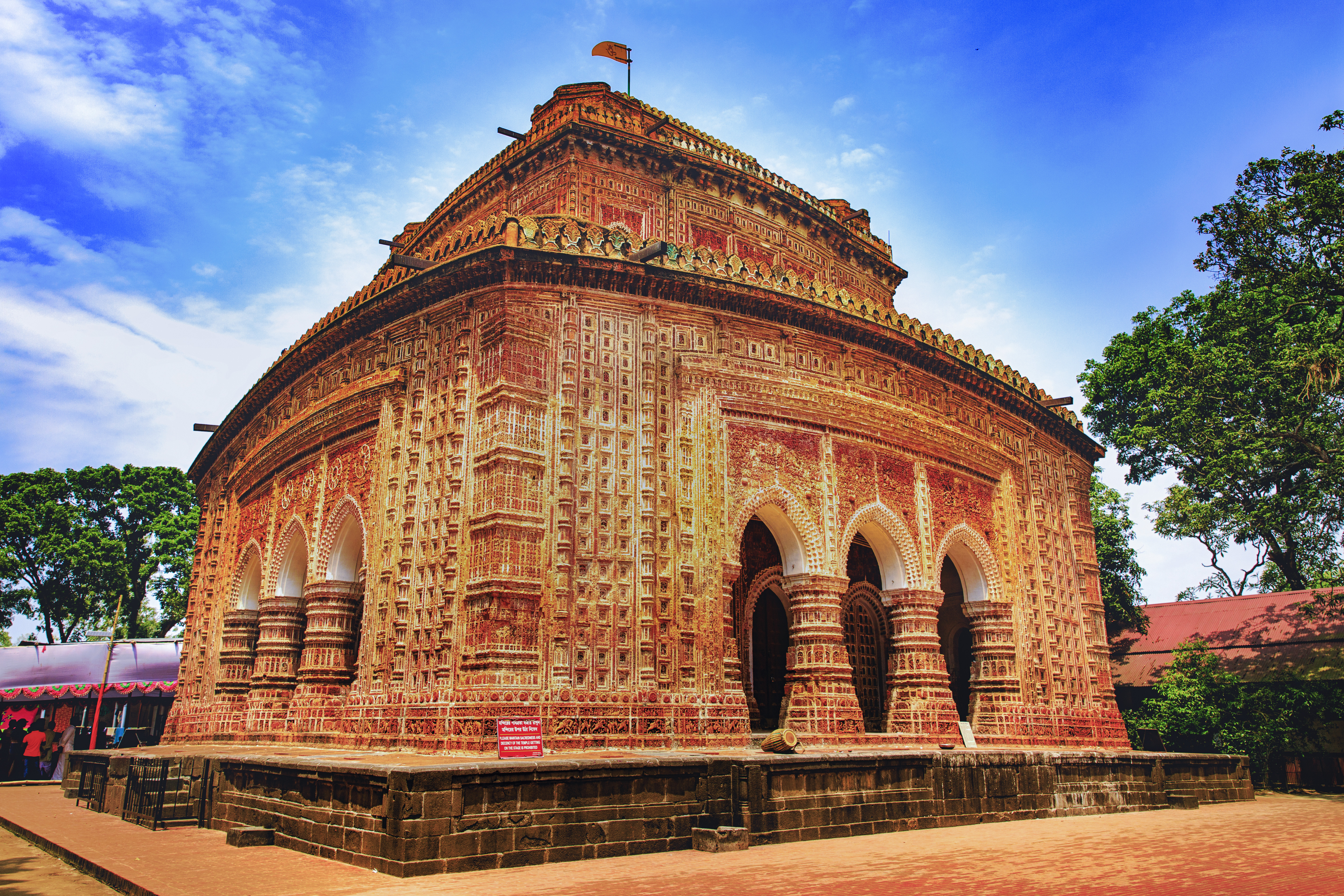
Naba-ratna Kantajew Temple in Dinajpur, Bangladesh.

Eka-ratna
This type of Ratna style has a "ratna" (pinnacle) in the center of the "charchala" roof. The Ek-Ratna temple was a particular favorite of the Malla rulers, who built many such temples in their capital city of Bishnupur. Ek-ratna temples are rare outside Bishnupur, but where they exist they were usually built in the 17th or early 18th century, such as at Daspur in Medinipur and, recently discovered, the Damodar temple at Kendur in Purba Bardhaman.
Pancha-ratna
The temple structure is single-storied in the Pancha-ratna style. In this type of temple style the superstructure consists of a large central tower (ratna) and four smaller towers (ratna) at the four corners of the chala. Similarity is observed to the Panchayatana temple style of North India (such as Khajuraho and Deogarh) with this layout, where the main temple is surrounded by smaller temples at the four corners of the plinth. Shyam Ray Temple in Bishnupur and the monumental Gokulchand Temple in Gokulnagar are classic examples of Pancharatna temples.
Naba-ratna
Naba-ratna temple has 9 ratnas (towers) and 2 storeys. The two storeys of the temple have a total of 8 chalas, each with 4 chalas. There are 4 ratnas (towers) in the four corners of the first storey and 4 ratnas (towers) in the four corners in second storey with a large central ratna (tower). The famous Dakshineswar Kali temple near Kolkata is built in Naba-ratna style. The greatest naba-ratna temple is the Kantajew temple at Kantanagar in Dinajpur. This huge and richly decorated temple was built in the early 18th century.
Other

- Trayodash-ratna: These types of temples consist of 13 ratnas.
- Pancharatna-ratna: These types of temples consist of 15 ratnas.
- Saptadasa-ratna: These types of temples consist of 17 ratnas.
- Panchavimsati-ratna: These types of temples consist of 25 ratnas.
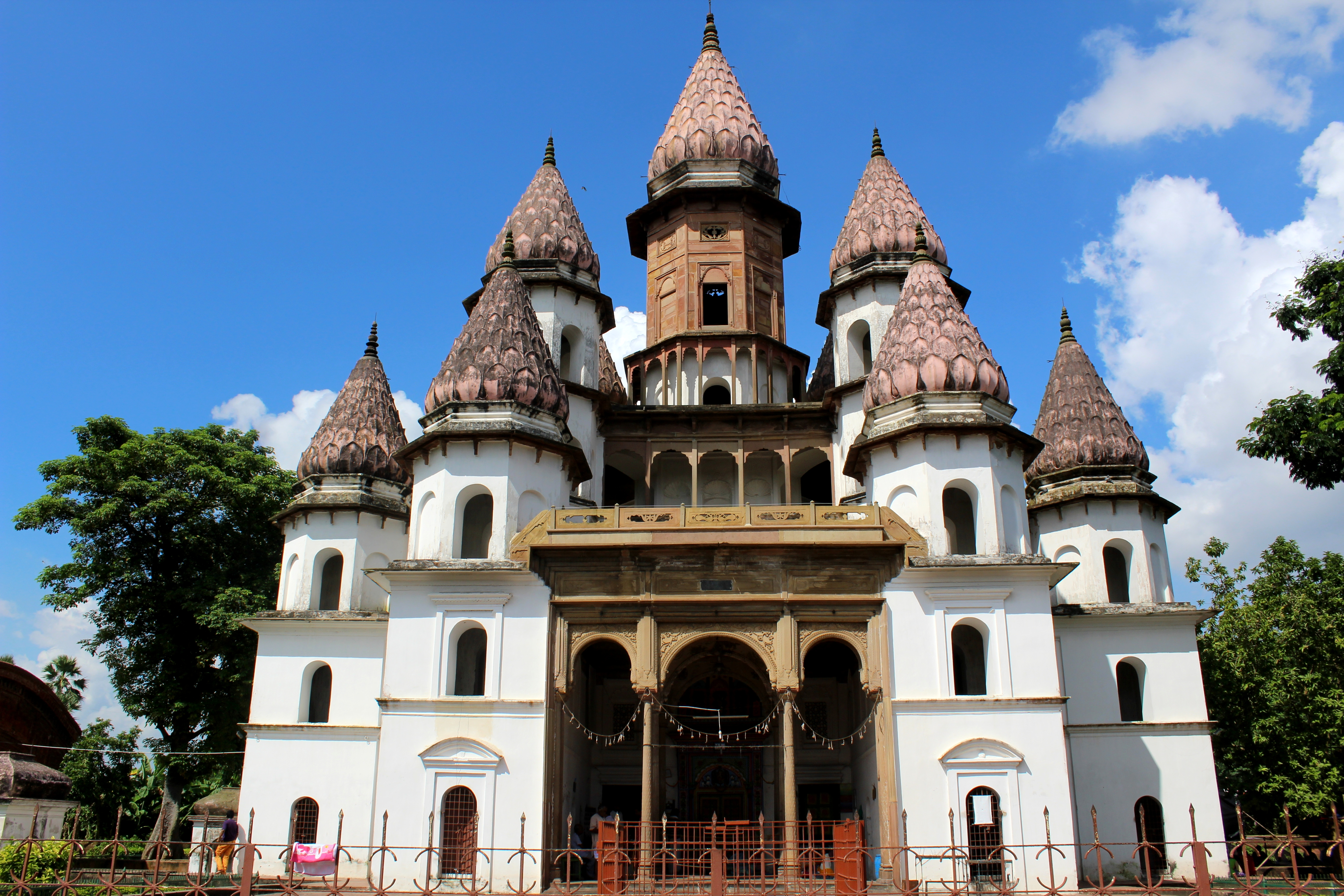
With 13 minars Hangseshwari temple has a distinct identity, at Bansberia, Hooghly district

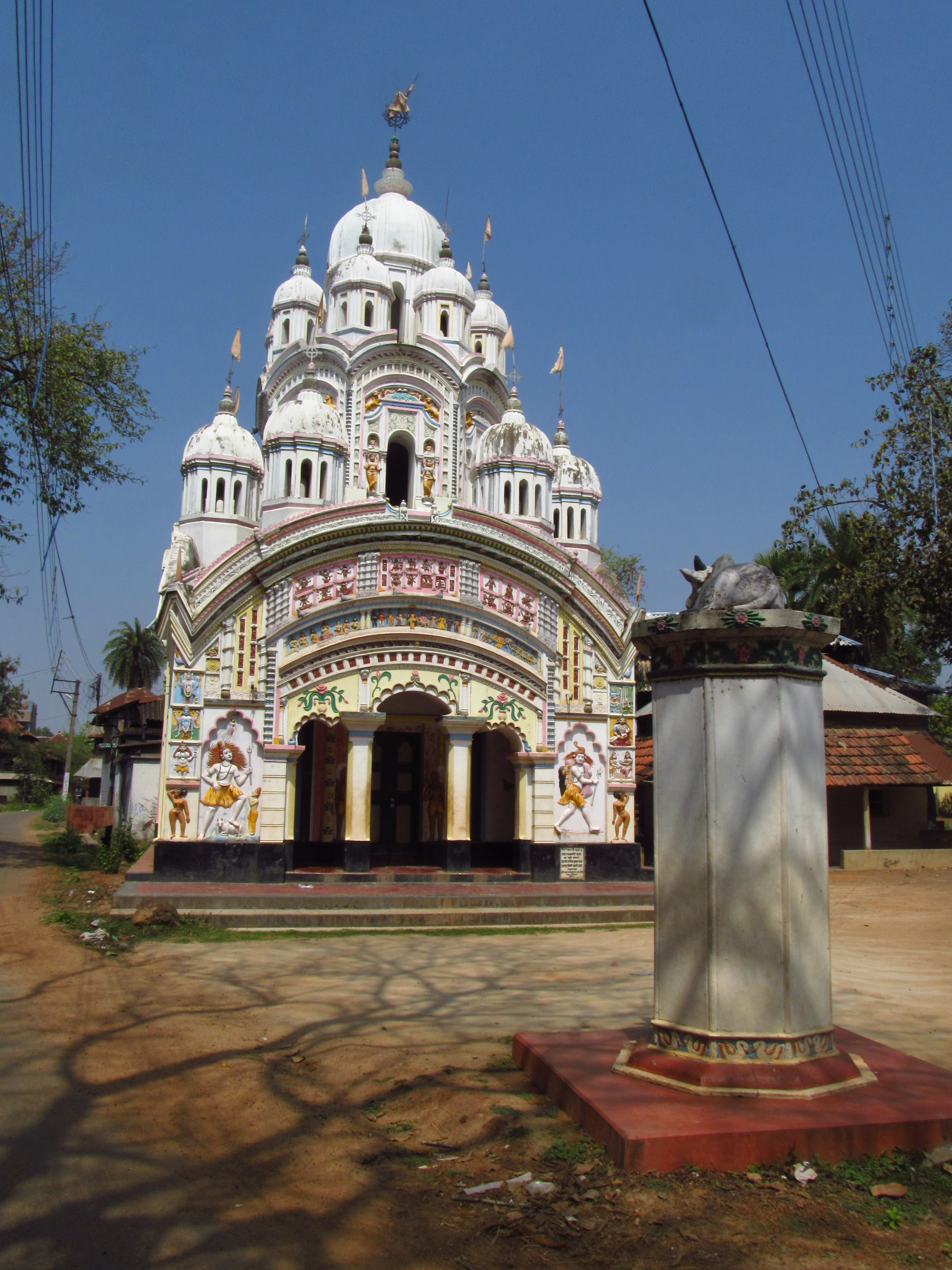
Saptadasa-ratna Parvatinatha Temple at Chandrakona, Paschim Medinipur district with 17 pinnacles

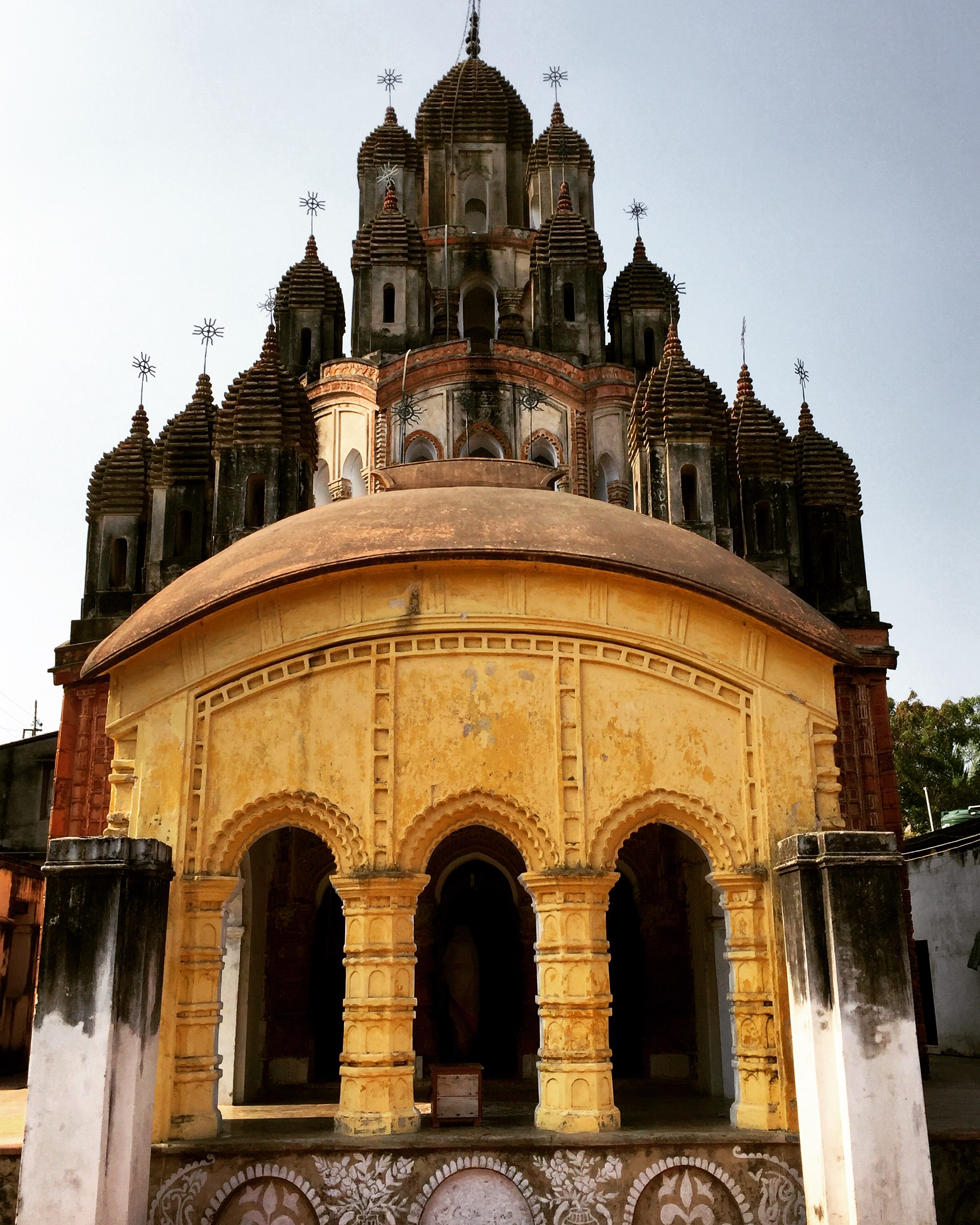
Panchavimsati-ratna Gopalbari temple at Kalna City, Purba Bardhaman district, with 25 pinnacles

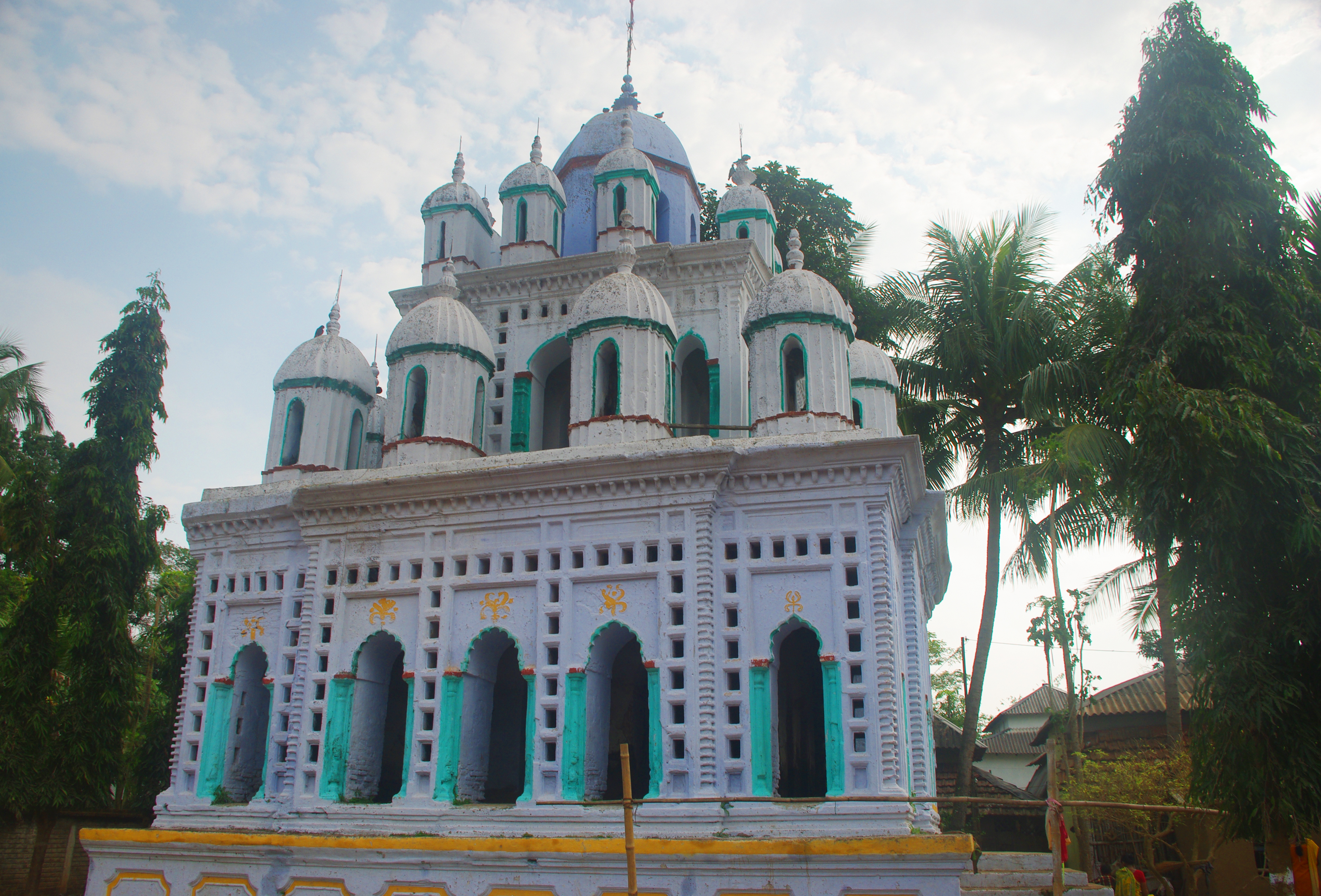
Panchavimsati-ratna rasmancha at Narajole, Paschim Medinipur district, with 25 pinnacles

== See also ==
- Bengal temple architecture
- Hindu temple architecture
