= Panca =

Panca is best known as a genus of butterflies - Panca (butterfly) but also:

- P-ANCA - Perinuclear Anti-Neutrophil Cytoplasmic Antibodies
- Pânca, Bucerdea Grânoasă a village in Romania
- Panka, a village (formerly known as Klyniwka) in Chernivtsi oblast, Ukraine
- Panca (artist) AKA Paola Villaseñor an American muralist
- Panca, a Spanish alternative spelling of the native Filipino bangka (boat)
- Ají panca, Peruvian chilli pepper

== See also ==
- Pancha (disambiguation)
- Pancha Tattva (disambiguation)
- Panchayat (disambiguation)
- Pañcasīla (disambiguation)
- Pancha Bhuta, five basic elements in Hinduism
- Pancha Pandavas, five early Indian football players
- Panchatantra, an ancient collection of Indian fables
