= Pancha =

Pancha may refer to:

- Pancha (garment), an item of male clothing worn in South Asia
- A clan of the Bharwad people of India
- Pancha Carrasco (1826–1890), Costa Rica's first woman in the military
- Pancha Merino (born 1973), Chilean actress and television presenter

== See also ==
- Panca (disambiguation)
- Pancha Tattva (disambiguation)
- Pancha Ratha (disambiguation)
- Pancharatna (disambiguation)
- Panchayatana (disambiguation)
- Panchayat (disambiguation)
- Pañcasīla (disambiguation)
- Panche (disambiguation)
- Pancho (disambiguation)
- Pancha Bhuta, five basic elements in Hinduism
- Pancha Pandavas, five early Indian football players
- Panchatantra, an ancient collection of Indian fables
- Poncho (disambiguation)
