= Global Traditional Medicine Centre =

The Global Traditional Medicine Centre is an organization set up by the World Health Organization in Jamnagar, Gujarat, India to promote traditional medicines.

== History ==
In 2023, the first WHO Traditional Medicine Global Summit was held in Gujarat, India alongside the G20 health ministerial meeting. At the summit, the establishment of the Global Traditional Medicine Centre was announced. The centre is set up with the Initial Investment of $250 million USD from the Indian Government.

== See also ==
- Ayurveda
- Ministry of Ayush
- Siddha medicine
