= Tattva (disambiguation) =

Tattva may refer to:

== Indian religions ==
- Tattva, a Sanskrit word meaning 'thatness', 'principle', 'reality' or 'truth'
  - Tattva (Jainism), the reals or the seven (sometimes nine) fundamental principles of Jainism
  - Tattva (Samkhya), in the Samkhya school of Indian philosophy
  - Tattva (Shaivism)
  - Tattva (Siddha medicine)
  - Tattva (Ayyavazhi)

== Music ==
- "Tattva" (song), a 1996 hit song by Kula Shaker.

== See also ==
- Tattvasaṃgraha (disambiguation)
- Pancha Tattva (disambiguation)
- Namarupa, "being" in Buddhism
- Kosha, concept of sheath in Hinduism
