= Hindu architecture =

Traditional system of Indian architecture as described in Hindu texts

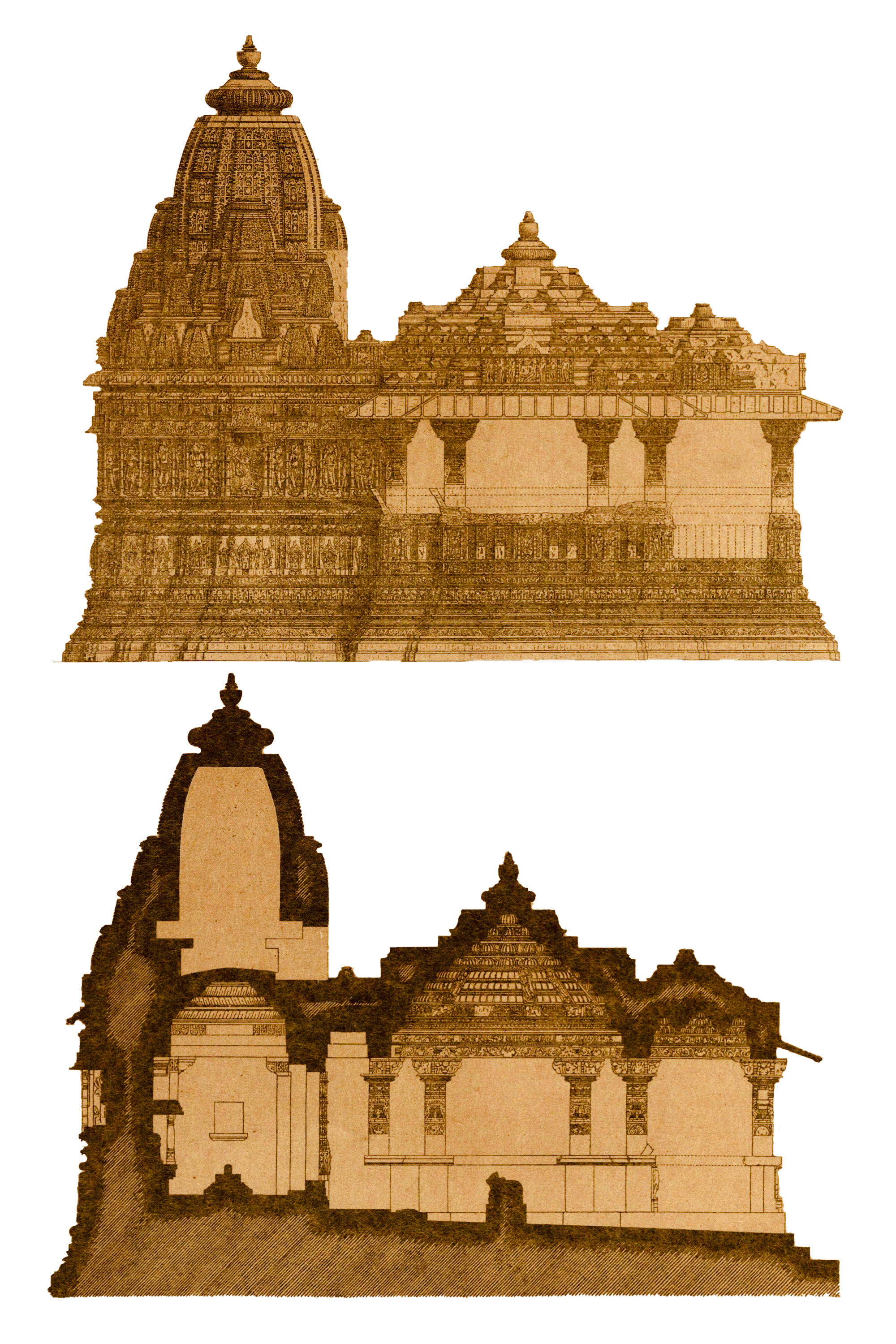
The architecture of a Hindu temple in Sunak, Gujarat

Hindu architecture is the traditional system of Indian architecture for structures such as temples, monasteries, market places, gardens and town planning as described in Hindu texts. The architectural guidelines survive in Sanskrit manuscripts and in some cases also in other regional languages. These texts include the Vastu shastras, Shilpa Shastras, the Brihat Samhita, architectural portions of the Puranas and the Agamas, and regional texts such as the Manasara among others.

By far the most important, characteristic and numerous surviving examples of Hindu architecture are Hindu temples, with an architectural tradition that has left surviving examples in stone, brick, and rock-cut architecture dating back to the Gupta Empire. Far fewer secular Hindu architecture have survived into the modern era, such as palaces, homes and cities. Ruins and archaeological studies provide a view of early secular architecture in India.

Studies on Indian palaces and civic architectural history have largely focussed on the Mughal and Indo-Islamic architecture particularly of the northern and western India given their relative abundance. In other regions of India, particularly the South, Hindu architecture continued to thrive through the 16th-century, such as those exemplified by the temples, ruined cities and secular spaces of the Vijayanagara Empire and the Nayakas. The secular architecture was never opposed to the religious in India, and it is the sacred architecture such as those found in the Hindu temples which were inspired by and adaptations of the secular ones. Further, states Harle, it is in the reliefs on temple walls, pillars, toranas and madapams where miniature version of the secular architecture can be found.

== Texts ==
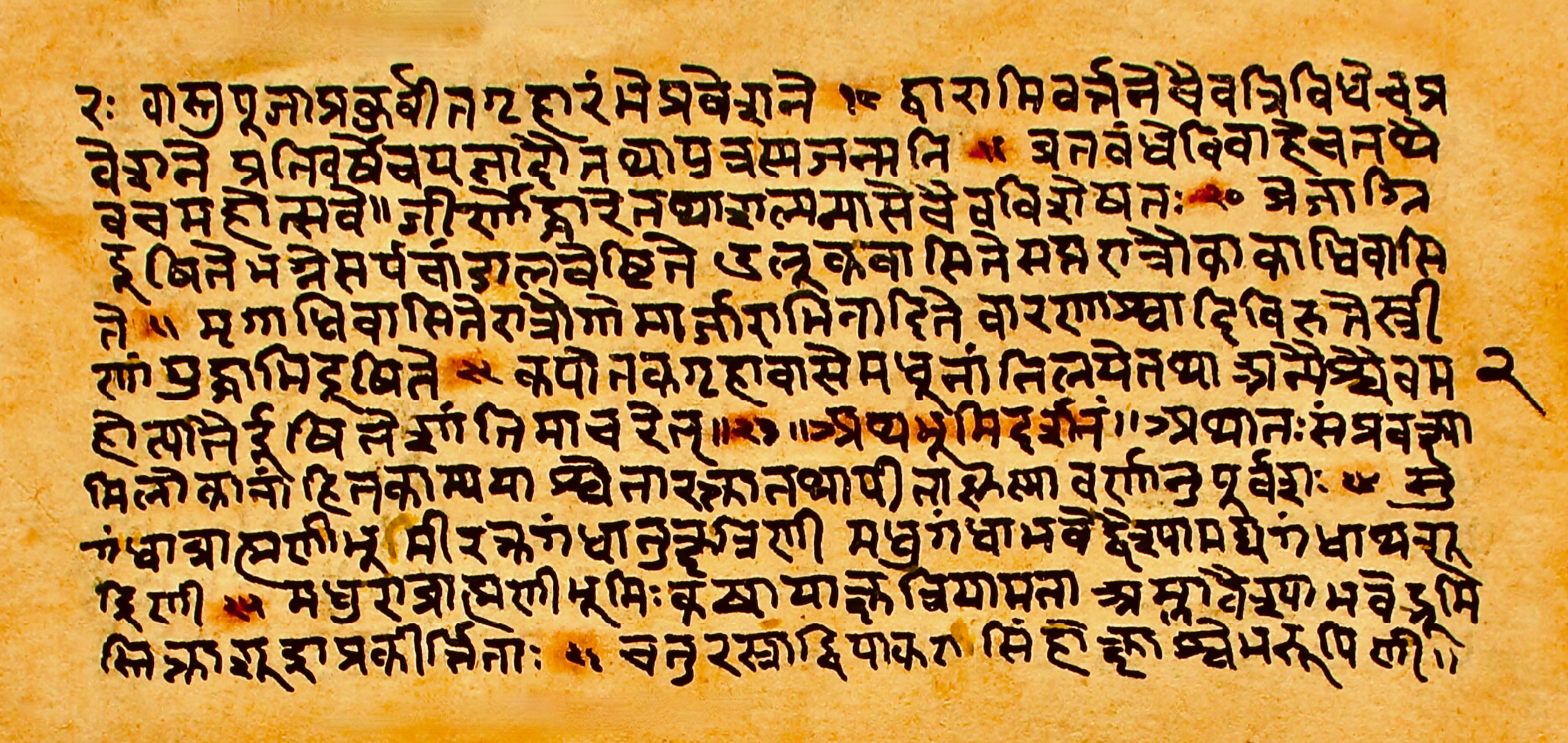
A folio of Visvakarmaprakasa, a minor Hindu architecture text discovered in Kathmandu valley, Nepal (Sanskrit Devanagari)

Vaastu Shastras and Shilpa Shastras are listed as one of 64 divine arts in ancient Indian texts. They are design manuals covering the art and science of architecture, typically mixing form, function with Hindu symbolism. The earliest, archaic and distilled version of Hindu architecture principles are found in the Vedic literature, traditionally considered as the Upavedas (lesser appendices to the Vedas), and called the Sthapatya Veda. Acharya's Encyclopedia of Hindu Architecture lists hundreds of Sanskrit manuscripts with more details on Hindu architecture that have survived into the modern age. They cover the architectural aspects of a wide range of subjects: ornaments, furniture, vehicles (wagons, carts), gateways, water tanks, drains, cities, streets, homes, palaces, temples and others. The most studied texts in the contemporary era are Sanskrit manuscripts in different Indic scripts. These include the Brihat Samhita (chapters 53, 56–58 and 79), the Manasara Shilpa Sastra, the Mayamata Vastu Sastra with commentaries in Telugu and Tamil, the Puranas (for example, chapters 42–62 and 104–106 of Agni Purana, chapter 7 of Brahmanda Purana) and the Hindu Agamas.

== Villages, towns and cities ==
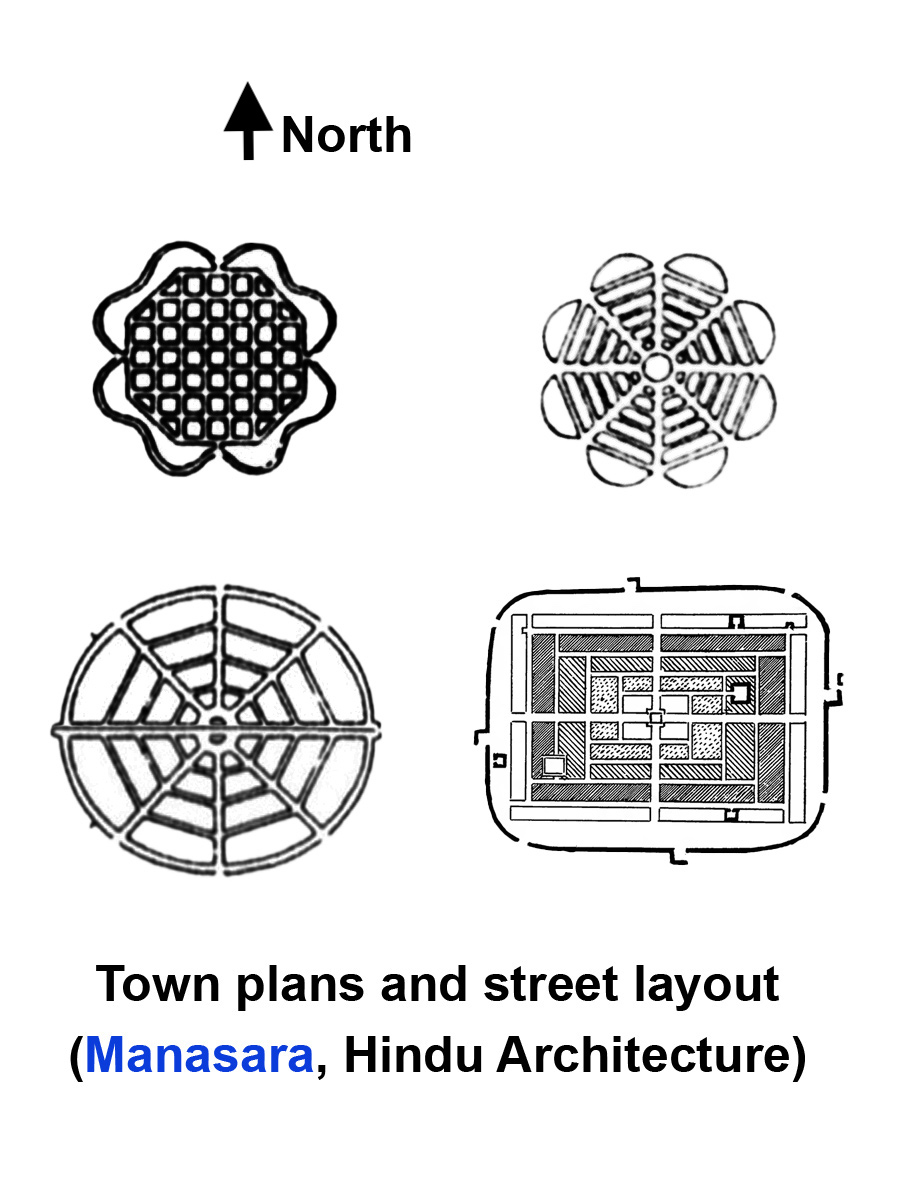
Some town plans recommended in the 700 CE Manasara Sanskrit text on Hindu architecture.

Hindu texts recommend architectural guidelines for homes, market places, gardens and town planning. The best site for human settlement, declares Manasara, seeks the right terrain with thick soil that slopes to open skies eastward so that the residents can appreciate the sunrise. It is near a river or significant water stream, and has enough ground water for wells – a second source of water. The soil, states Manasara, should be firm, rich for growing flowers, vegetables and fruit trees, and of agreeable odor. The text recommends that the town planners dig and check the soil quality for a stable foundation to homes and public buildings. Once the location is accepted, the text describes forty plans for laying out the streets, the homes, markets, gardens and other infrastructure necessary for the settlement. Example architectural plans include Dandaka, Prastara, Chaturmukha, Padmaka, Karmuka, Swastika and others. The Hindu texts vary, with five shared principles:

- Diknirnaya: principles of orientation
- Padavinyasa : site planning
- Hastalakshana : proportionate measurement ratios of sections
- Ayadi : six canonical principles of architecture
- Patakadi : aesthetics or character of each building or part of the overall plan

The guidelines combine principles of early Hindu understanding of science, spiritual beliefs, astrology and astronomy. In practice, these guidelines favor symmetry set to the cardinal directions, with many plans favoring the streets to be aligned with seasonal winds direction, integrated with the terrain and the needs of the local weather. A temple or public assembly hall at the center of the town is recommended in Manasara.

== Hospitals, hospices ==
The early Hindu texts on medicine and surgery mention dedicated buildings and halls to take care of sick people, and recommend that architects with Vastu Vidya (वास्तुविद्या) expertise should construct these. The Charaka Samhita dated between 100 BCE to 150 CE, for example, in book 1, verse 15.6 (sutrasthana) states: (Note: The verse 1.15.7 describes how this hospital building should be furnished with beds, chairs, bedsheets, pillows, spitoon, drug grinders, affectionate nurses, pharmacy, supplies, patient care equipment etc.)

[...] दृढं निवातं प्रवातैकदेशं सुखप्रविचारमनुपत्यकं धूमातपजलरजसामनभिगमनीयमनिष्ठानां च शब्दस्पर्शरसरूपगन्धानां सोदपानोदूखलमुसलवर्चःस्थानस्नानभूमिमहानसं वास्तुविद्याकुशलः प्रशस्तं गृहमेव तावत् पूर्वमुपकल्पयेत्।||६||
[...] – In the first place a mansion must be constructed under the supervision of an engineer well-conversant with the science of building mansions and houses. It should be spacious and roomy. The element of strength should not be wanting in it. Every part of it should not be exposed to strong winds or breezes. One portion at least should be open to the currents of wind. It should be such that one may move or walk through it with ease. It should not be exposed to smoke, or the sun, or dust, or injurious sound and taste and form and scent. It should be furnished with staircases, with pestles and mortars, privies, accommodation for belting, and cook-rooms.
– Translated by Avinash Kaviratna
[...] – the one expert in architecture should, first of all, arrange for an auspicious house which should be strong, wind-free (isolated from wind), ventilated, having comfortable moving space, not situated in a valley, inaccessible to smoke (or) sun (or) water (or) taste (or) sight (or) smell, and provided with water reservoir, mortar pestle, lavatory, bathroom and kitchen.
– Translated by Priya Sharma
[...] – Thus, an expert in the science of building should first construct a worthy building. It should be strong, out of the wind, and part of it should be open to the air. It should be easy to get about in, and should not be in a depression. It should be out of the path of smoke, sunlight, water, or dust, as well as unwanted noise, feelings, tastes, sights and smells. It should have water supply, pestle and mortar, lavatory, bathing area, and a kitchen.
– Translated by Dominik Wujastyk (under subtitle: The Hospital Building)

— Caraka Samhita, 1.15.6

== Arts and civic buildings ==
The Narada Shilpasastra is another early Sanskrit treatise on architecture. It has 83 chapters, with chapters on plans for villages and cities, on architectural guidelines for palaces and houses, on public water tanks, on Hindu temples, as well as construction of public civic buildings. Chapters 60 through 66 of Narada Silpa discuss special Śālā for community services and enjoyment, with chapter 61 on Bhojan-sala (feeding house), chapter 65 on Nataka (performance arts), and chapter 66 discussing a building to display arts and paintings. Chapter 71 discusses how chitra (painting) should be used to enliven homes and civic buildings.

Chitra-sala and other "entertainment houses", states Narada Silpasastra, should be located in the middle of a city, preferably the main street or where major roads of the city cross or near major temples or palace. This building's mandapam (hall) must be spacious and ventilated. It should have pictures that "captivate our minds" and "give joy to the eyes", laid out by rules of proportion and rules of "pose-determining lines", according to a translation by Raghavan. Chapter 66 further recommends specific designs. For example, it describes a civic building for display of art that is circular (mardala, drum-like), with main entrance and smaller ones enclosing a court-like space, terraces, and halls to divide the building into sections. These halls should itself display some items of pleasure such as carvings, colorful patterns on the floor, and brightly colored Devas, Gandharvas and Kinnaras.

Another group of civic buildings described in Hindu texts are the preksha-sala (building for drama/stage performance) and sangita-sala or natya-sala (dance performance). These are categorized in three: those in temples for religious arts, in city for general entertainment, or in a palace for the king and his guests. The Samarangana Sutradhara of Bhoja, for example, dedicates its chapter 34 to these buildings and adds that the walls of the performance hall should adorned pictures of damsels dancing or playing instruments. The plan for Natya-mandapa with space for the dancers, space for the musicians that co-perform with the dancers, space where the dance-drama artists can change their dress for different acts (Nepathya-dhama) and for the prekshaka (audience) are discussed in chapter 39 of Kumara's Silpa Ratna. The Narada Silpasastra uses the term "Nataka-salas", recommending that the performance stage should be raised on a platform so that the audience can get a better view, the audience hall should be decorated for the audience to admire before and after the performance. These arts and architectural principles may have evolved out of more ancient Indian traditions for performance arts, states Varadpande, as is implied in the Buddhist text Brahmajāla Sutta where the Buddha forbids his bhikshus (monks) from watching dances, music performances and similar public shows in Majjhima-sila. The text Natyasastra recommends architectural guidelines for the Natya theatre, but without drawings and plans. The theatre mentioned in Natyasastra probably housed an audience of 200 to 500 patrons comfortably seated, states Farley Richmond – a scholar of Indian theatre.

== Temples (mandirs) ==
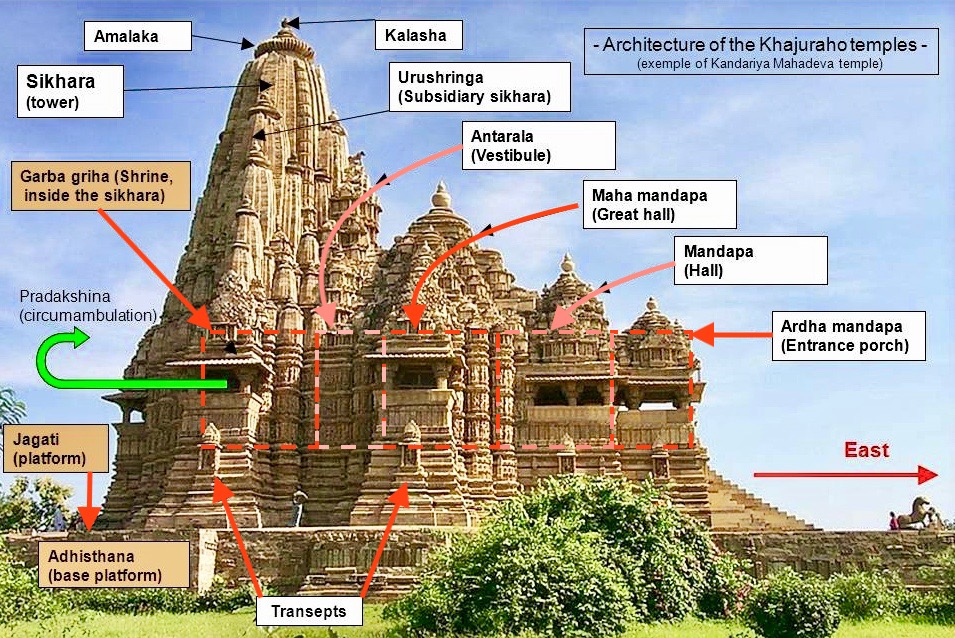
Elements of a North Indian temple (Madhya Pradesh)

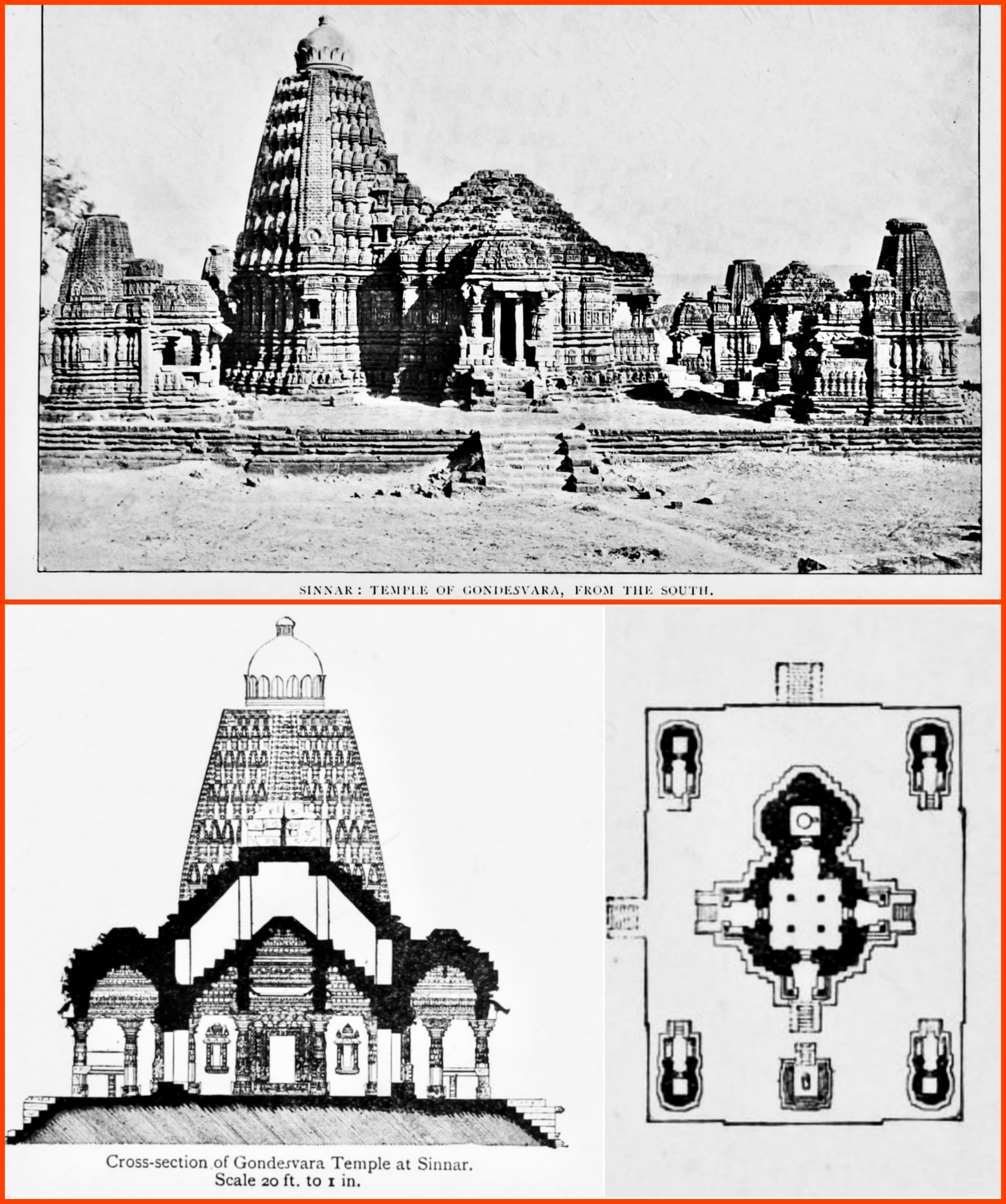
The architectural plan of the Gondeshwar temple near Nashik (Maharashtra)

Hindu temple architecture has many varieties of style whose historic role has been to provide "a focus for both the social and spiritual life" for the Hindu community it serves, states George Michell. Every Hindu temple ("mandir") is imbued with symbolism, yet the basic structure of each stays the same. Each temple has an inner sanctum or the sacred space, the garbha griha or womb-chamber, where the primary murti or the image of a deity is housed in a simple bare cell for darshana (view, meditative focus). Above the garbhagriha is a tower-like shikhara, called the vimana in south India. This sanctum is surrounded by a closed or open path for pradakshina (also called parikrama, circumambulation) that is typically intricately carved with symbolic art depicting Hindu legends, themes of artha, dharma and kama as well as the statues of significant deities of three major Hindu traditions (Vishnu, Shiva and Shakti).

The sanctums of significant temples have a mandapa congregation hall, and sometimes an antarala antechamber and porch between garbhagriha and mandapa. Major temples that attract pilgrims from far typically have mandapas or other buildings that service the pilgrims. These may be connected or detached from the temple. The main temple may exist with other smaller temples or shrines in the temple compound. The streets around the temple are markets and hubs of economic activity. There are examples of special dance pavilions (Nata Mandir), like in the Konark Sun Temple. The pool, temple tank (Kunda) is also part of large temples, and they traditionally have served as a place for a bath dip and ablutions for pilgrims. The same essential architectural principles are found in the historic Hindu temples of southeast Asia.

=== Gopurams ===
Essentially independent architectural structure is an element of the temple complex as gopuram, viz., gatehouse towers, usually ornate, often with colossal size, at the entrance of a Hindu temple of Southern India.

== Monasteries (mathas) ==
Hindu monasteries such as mathas and hermitages (ashrams) are complexes of buildings include temples, monastic cells or the communal house and ancillary facilities.

== Rathas ==
In some Hindu sites, there are shrines or buildings named rathas because they have the shape of a huge chariot.

== Toranas (archways) ==
Torana is a free-standing archway for ceremonial purposes seen in the Hindu, Buddhist and Jain architecture in front of the temples, monasteries and other objects, sometimes as single building.

== Stambhas (columns) ==
Stambha denotes a pillar or column, and is also known as jangha, stali, angrika, sthanu, arani, bharaka or dharana. It is described in Manasara to consist of a pedestal, base, column and a capital. It can be made from wood or stone, be independent or be a pilaster joined to one of the walls. The text describes different proportions for different materials of construction. The length of column is divided intomatras (portions), and these may be decorated with artwork. The Manasara suggests rules for tapering the top portions of the stambha. Illustrative stambhas include the Vijay Stambha (Tower of victory) at Chittorgarh fort, Rajasthan. It is dedicated to Vishnu.

The Dhvaja-stambhas are found at the entrance of temples as flagstaffs, often with the image of lingam and sacred animals.

== Chhatris ==
Chhatris are elevated, dome-shaped pavilions used as an element in Indian architecture, originating in Rajasthani architecture. They are widely used in palaces, in forts, or to demarcate funerary sites, etc.

== Outside of South Asia ==
=== Indonesia ===
Historically, Hinduism was once the predominant religious take of some Native Indonesians (chiefly Western Indonesians) in Indonesia, predates the existence of Buddhism, Islamism, and Christianity. The country was enriched with abundance of Hindu architecture, mainly served as religious purpose (place of worship, etc.).

According to Indonesian categorization, Hindu architecture temples could be divided into 3 main types with different terminology attached to its respective identity, the first one is called Candi (from Old Javanese caṇḍi), specifically refers to the Hindu temple architecture of Java-origin. The second one is known as Pura (from Balinese ᬧᬸᬭ 'pura'), refers to an architecture style of Balinese to perform their Balinese Hinduism worship. The last one, similar to Hindu majority globally, known in Indonesian as Kuil, specifically refers to Hindu of Dravidian-origin temple architecture, usually represent the Indian Indonesian community (as opposed to Native Indonesian form of Hinduism). All types of Hindu architecture in Indonesia are functioned as place of worship, but also could be used as the place of historical observance to broaden the knowledge and awareness about Hinduism amongst the non-Hindu population, to draw the sense of tolerance and unity within the country (it is also applied to every worship places of diverse religious background in Indonesia).

== Gallery ==
Some folios from surviving manuscripts on Hindu architecture

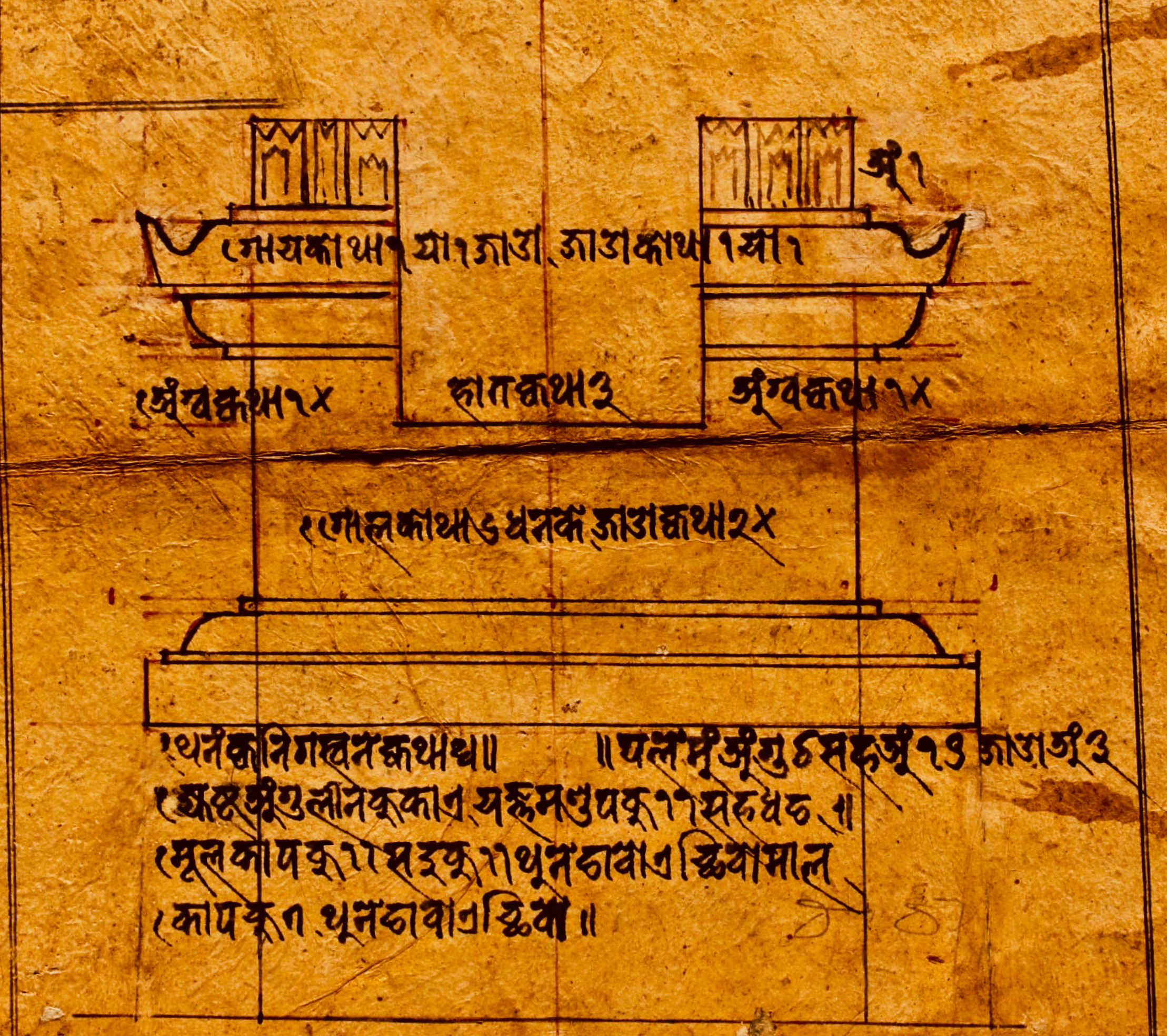
Drawing and notes on Hiti, a public water spout

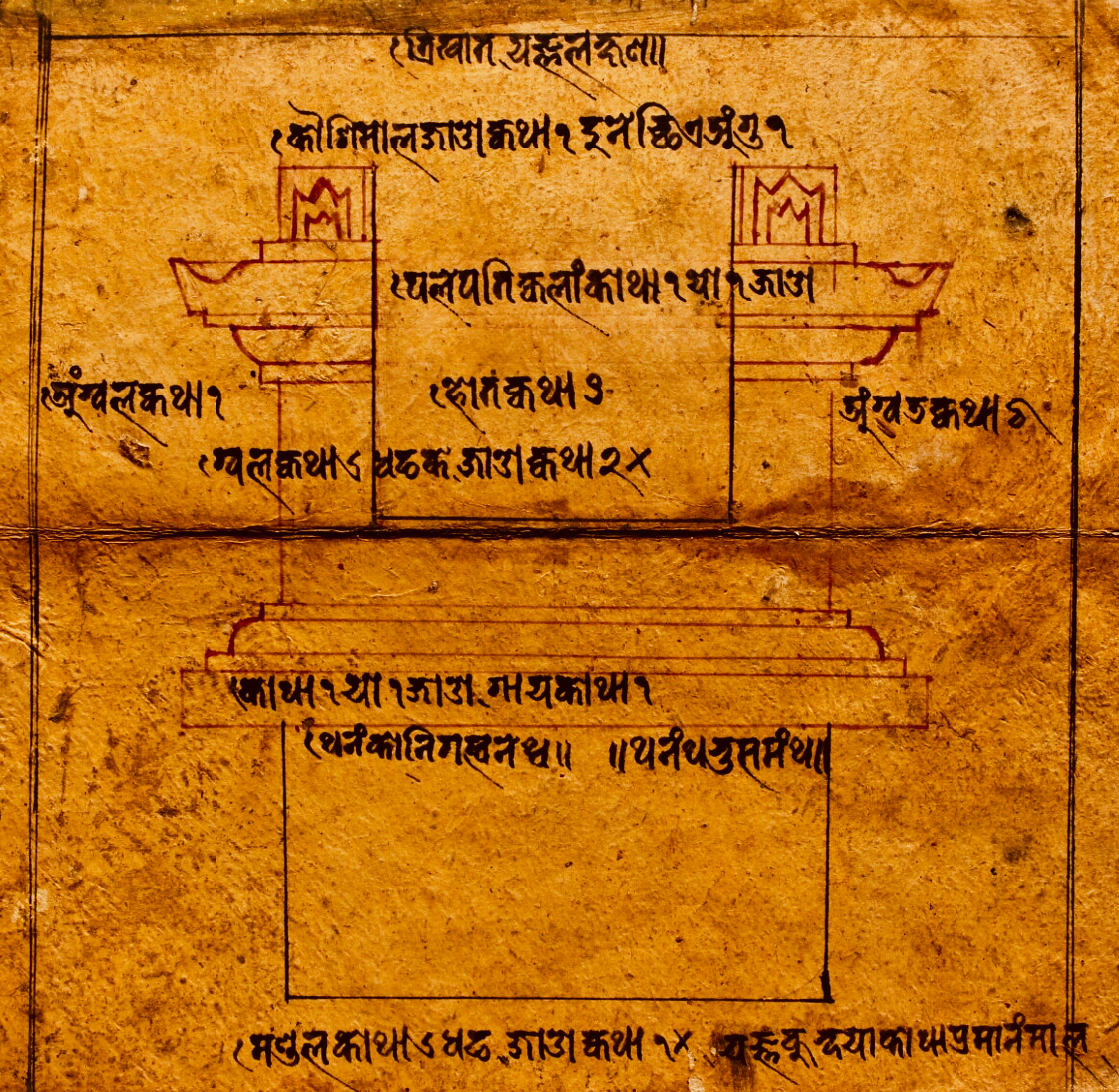
Drawing and notes on Hiti, a public water spout, part 2

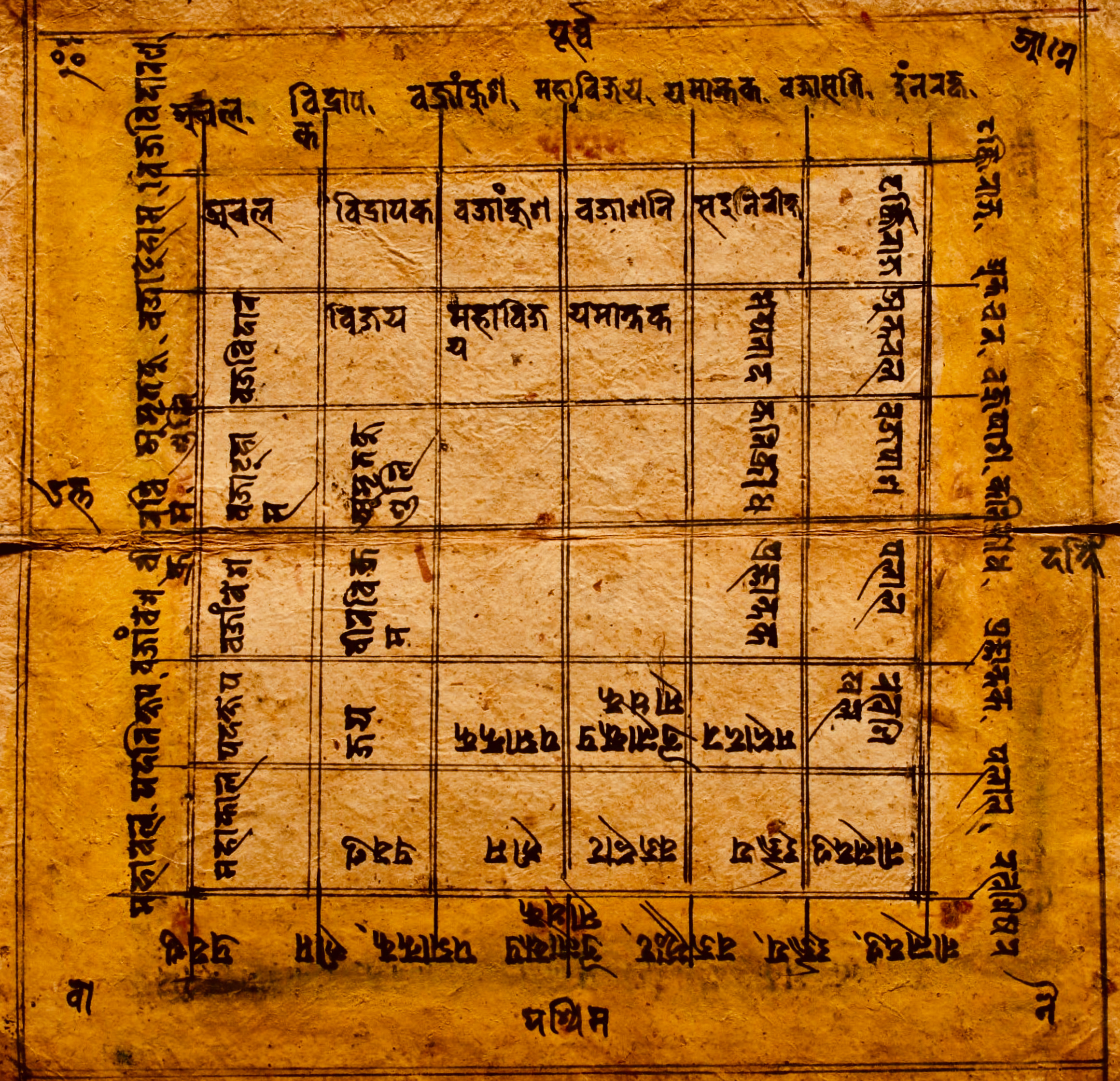
A mandala in Vastu Sastra Hiti Dayeka

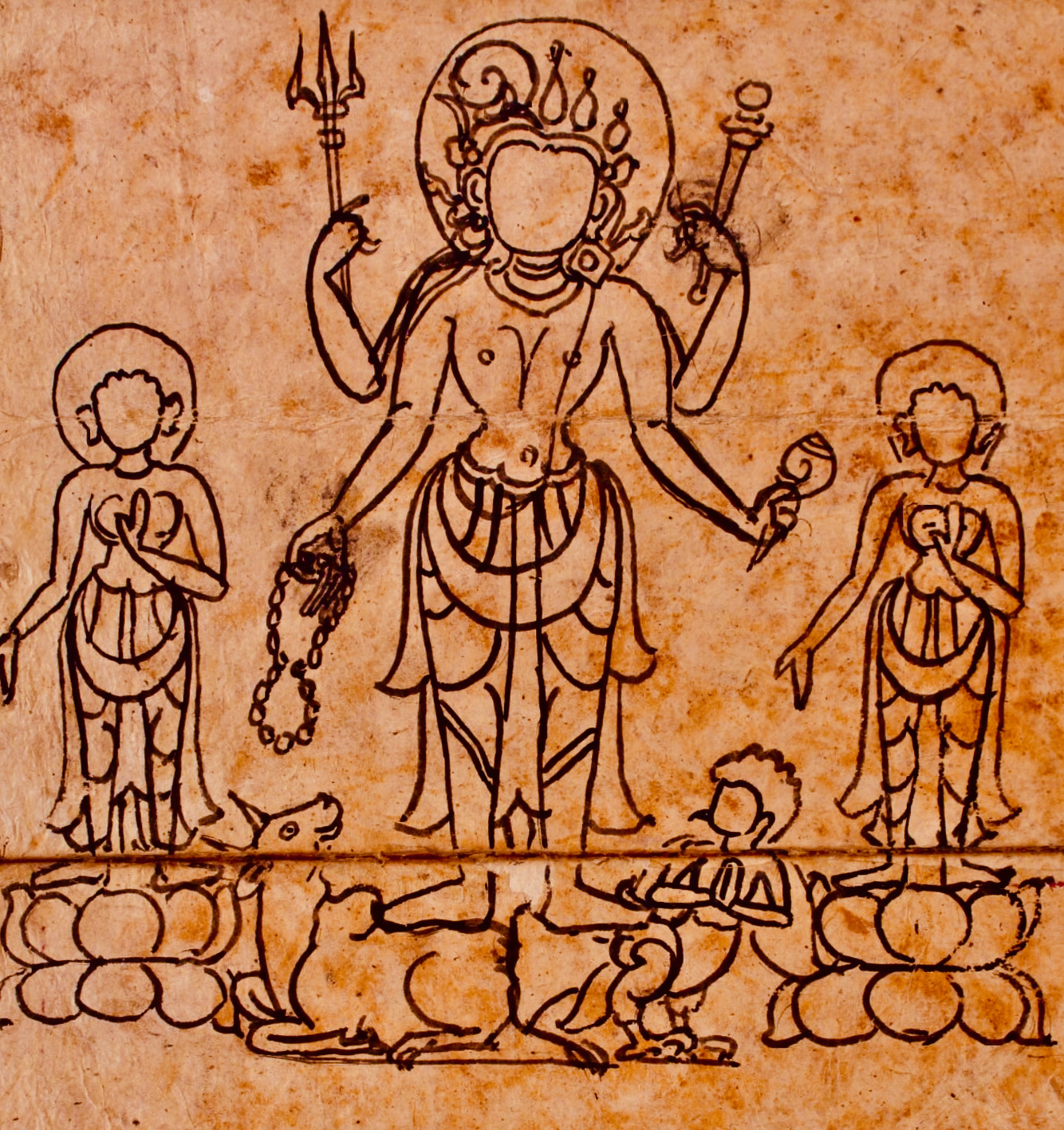
Two leaves in Samkrantiyajnavidhi illustrating proportions for Harihara – half Shiva, half Vishnu

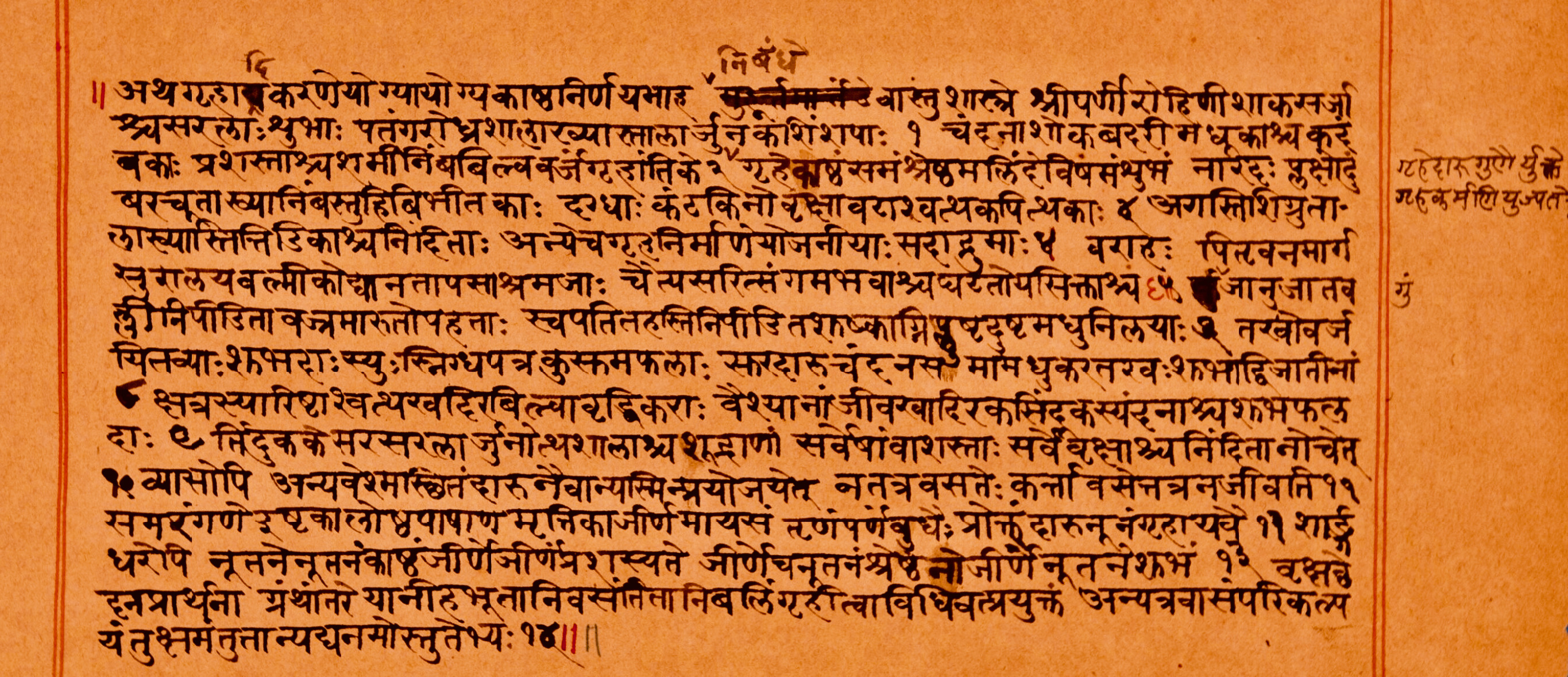
A Vastu sastra page on home design, first line mentions vastu sastra

Some temples and public stepwells

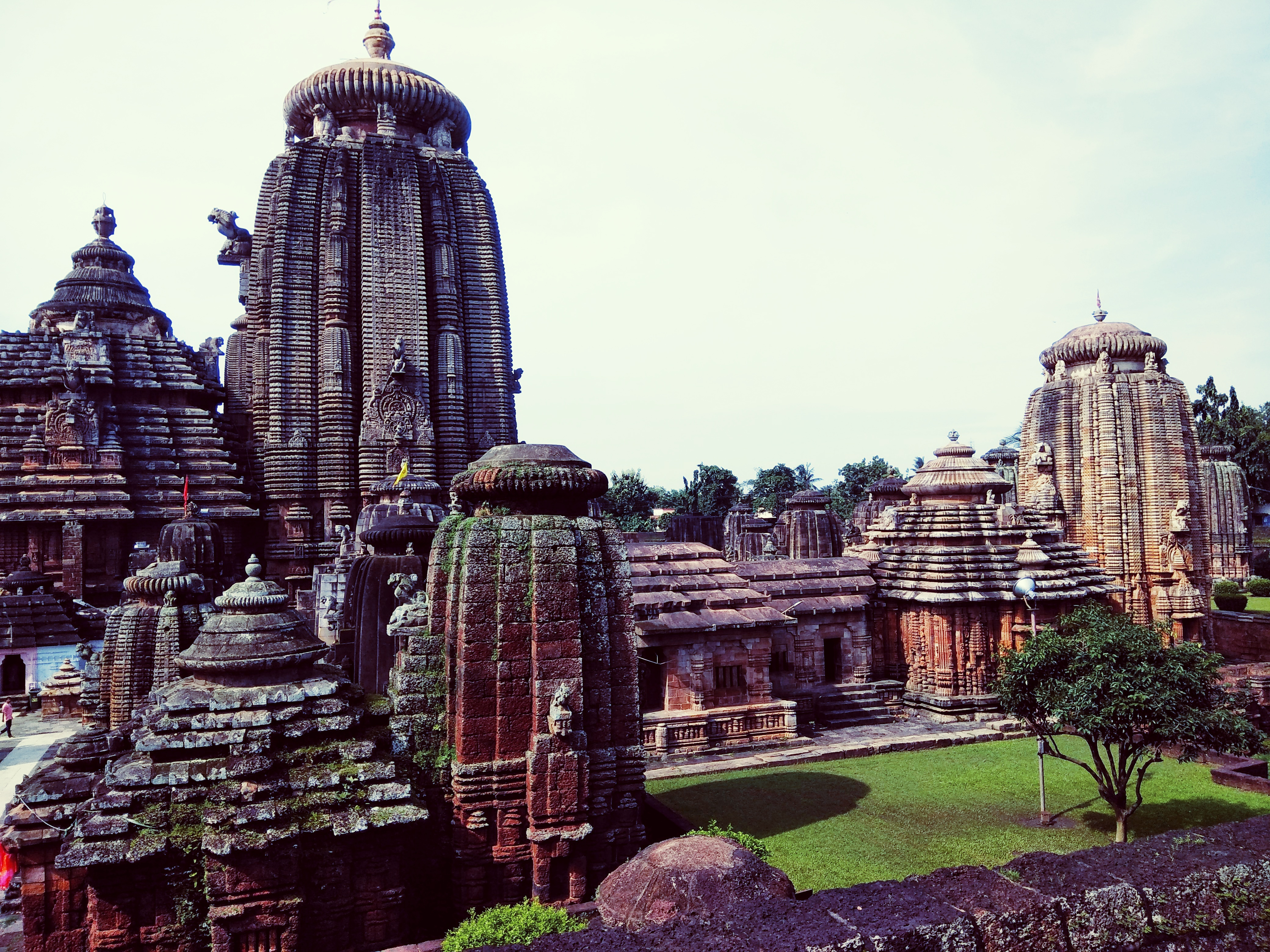
Lingaraja Temple (Bhubaneswar, Odisha)

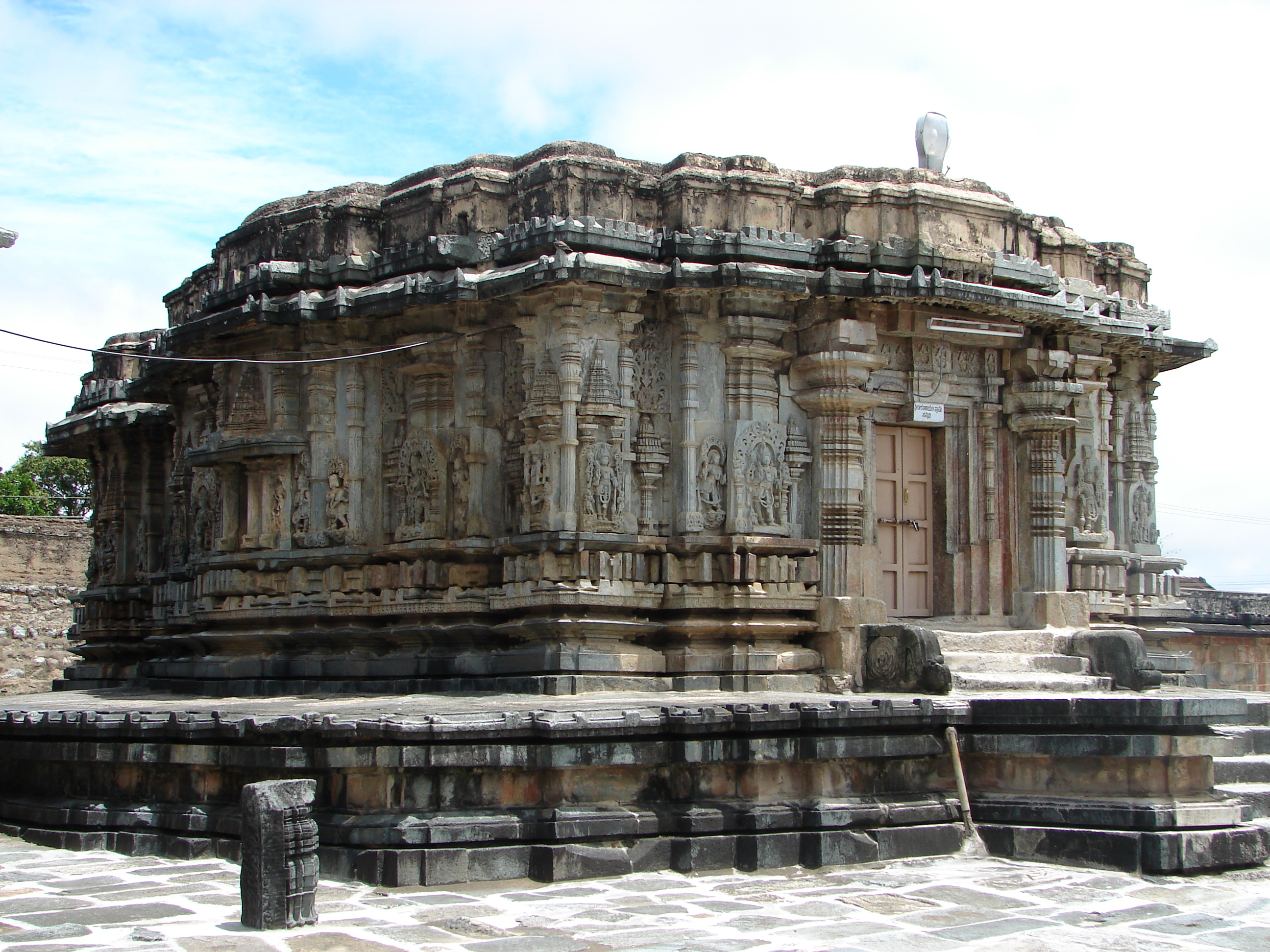
Chennakeshava Temple, Belur (Karnataka)

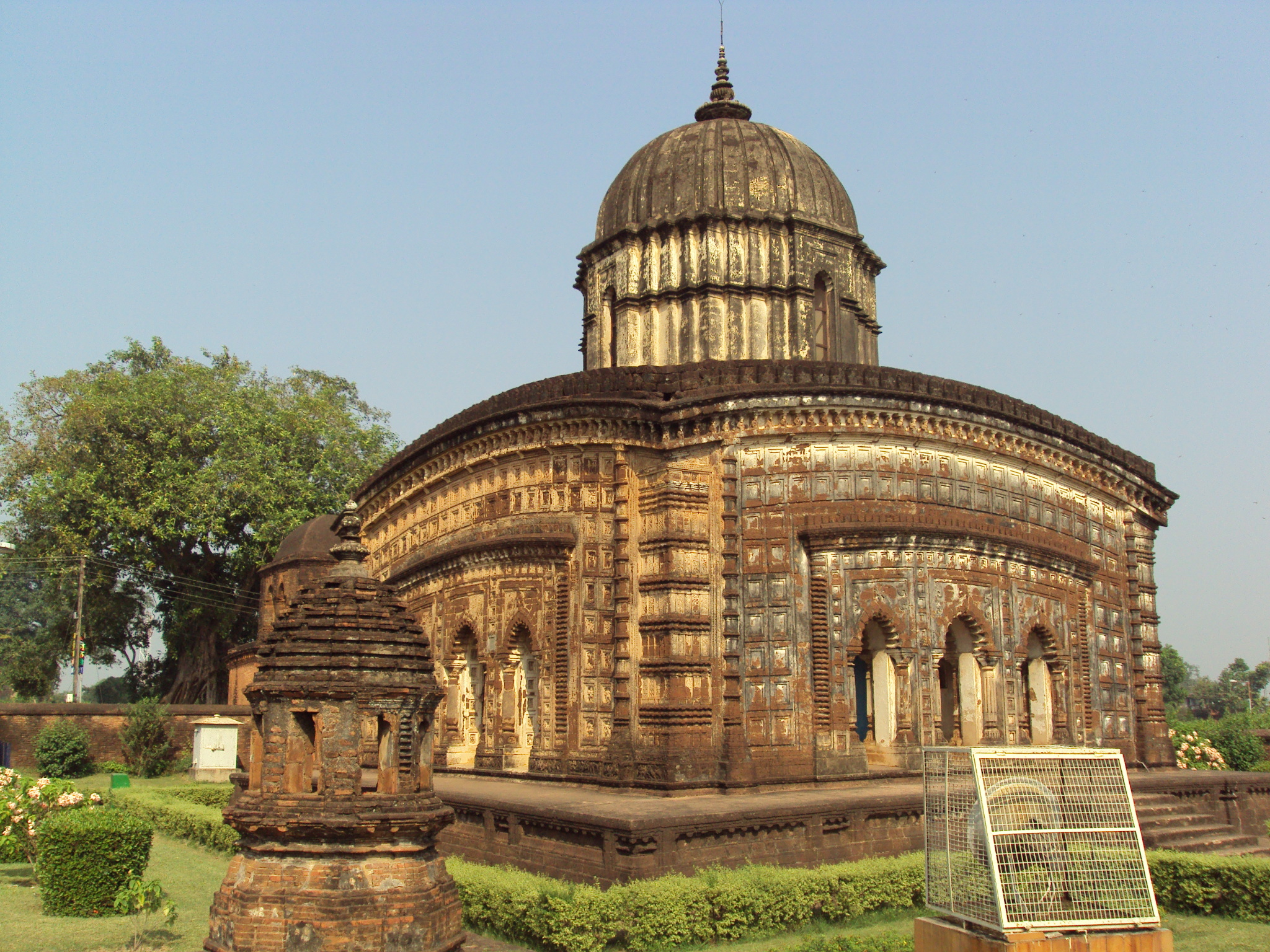
Lalji temple (Bishnupur, Bankura, West Bengal)

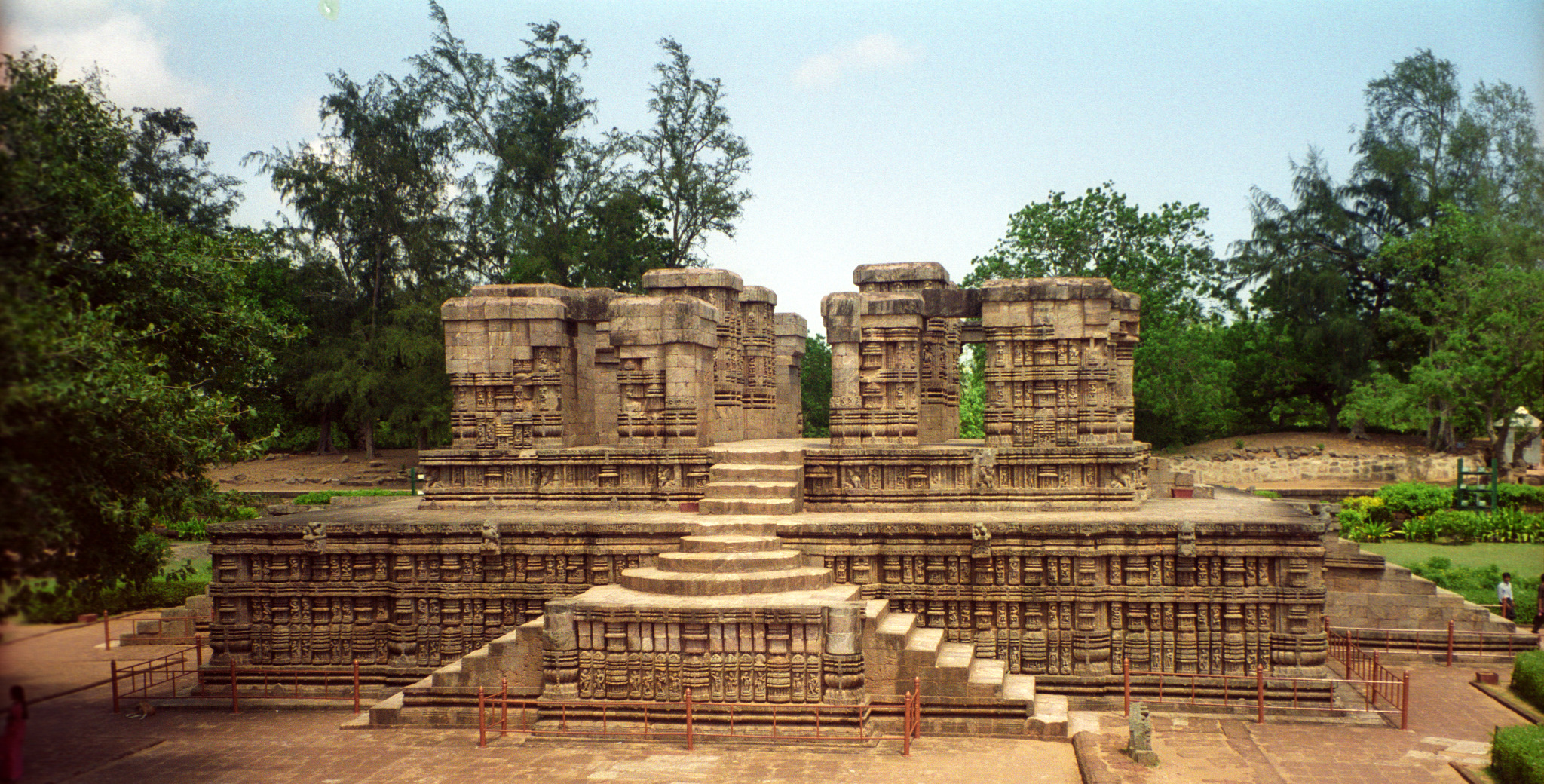
Nata Mandir of Konark Sun Temple (Odisha)

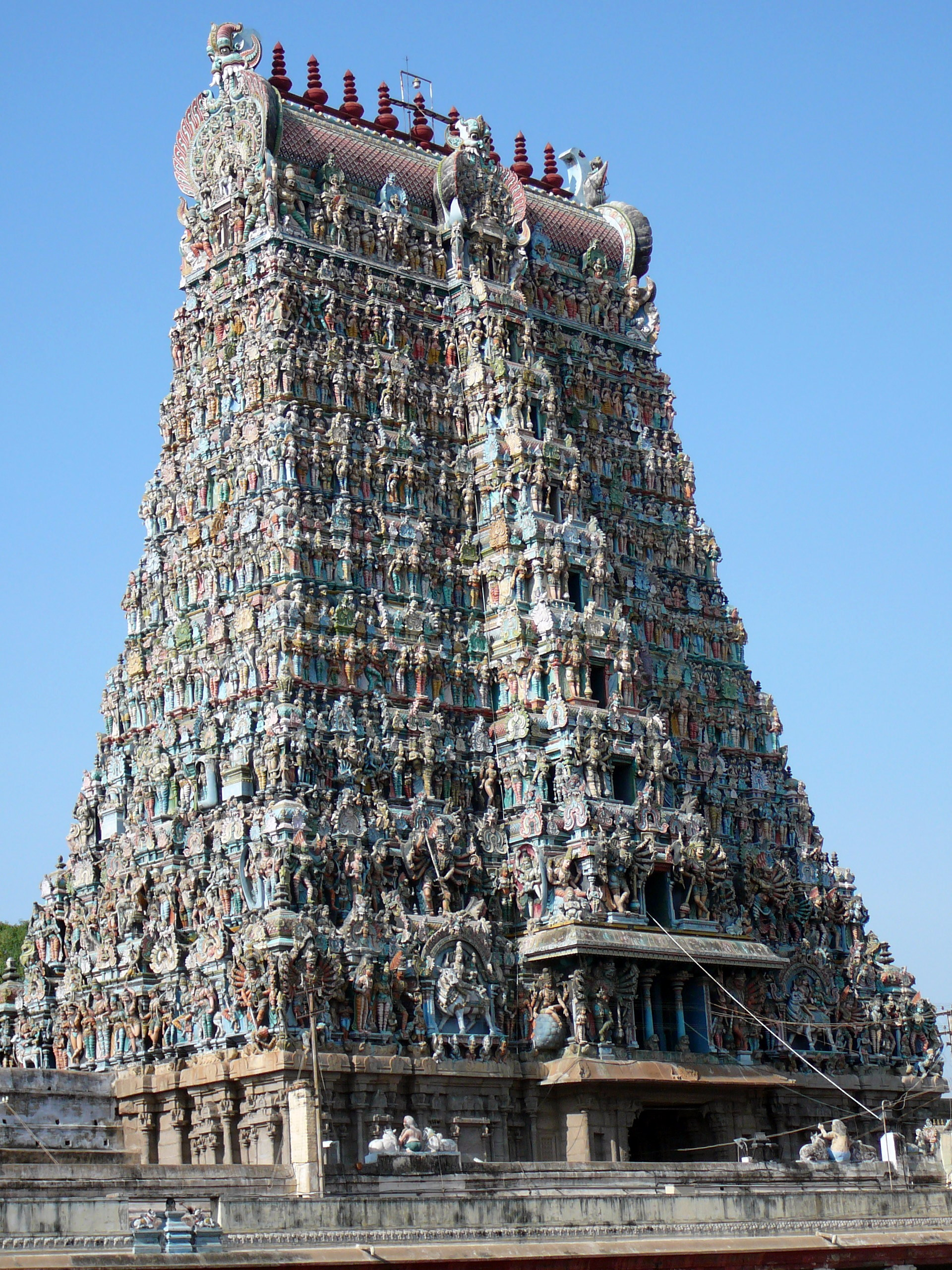
Meenakshiamman Temple Gopuram (Madurai, Tamil Nadu)

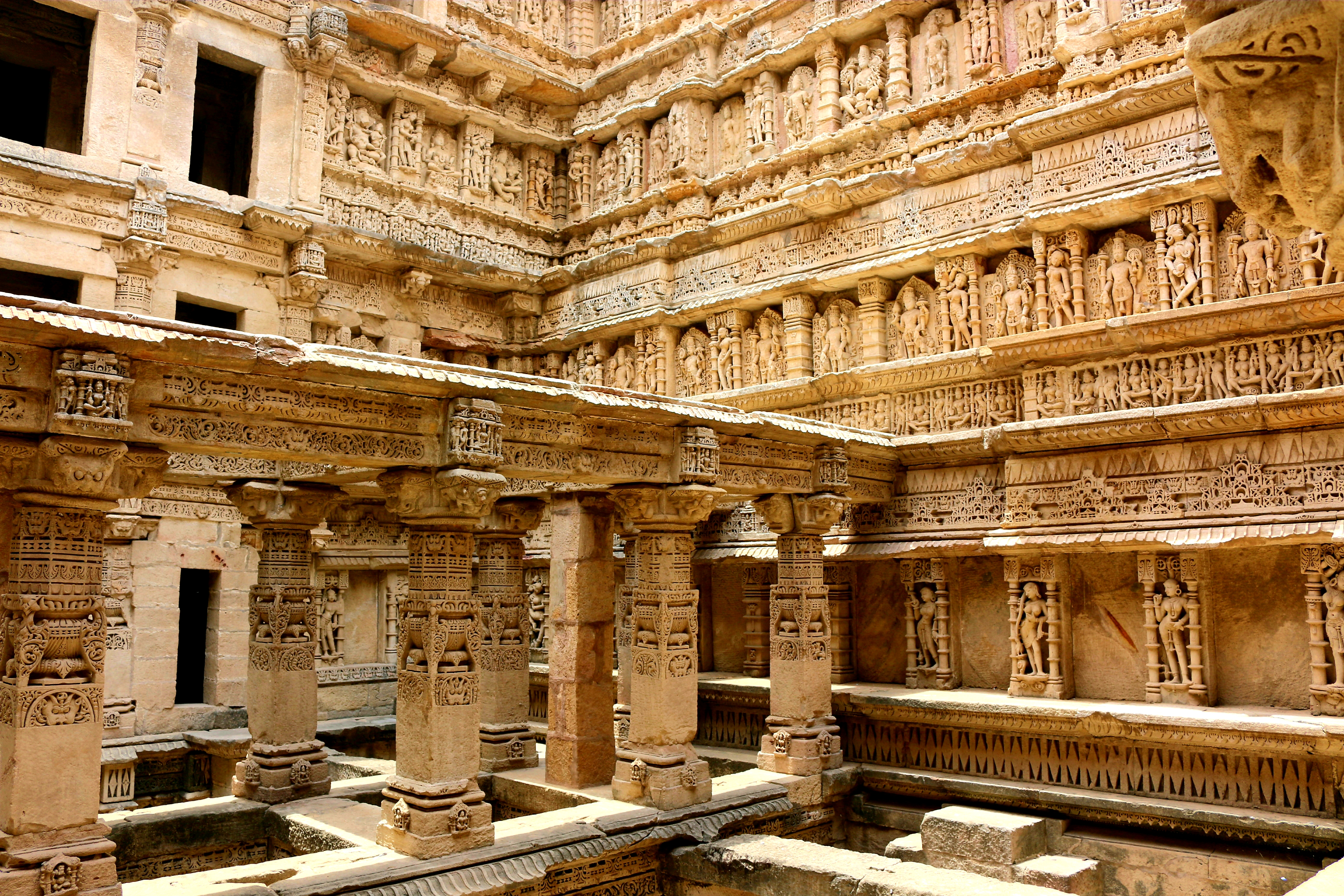
Rani ka vav Gujarat, a historic public water tank with Hindu arts

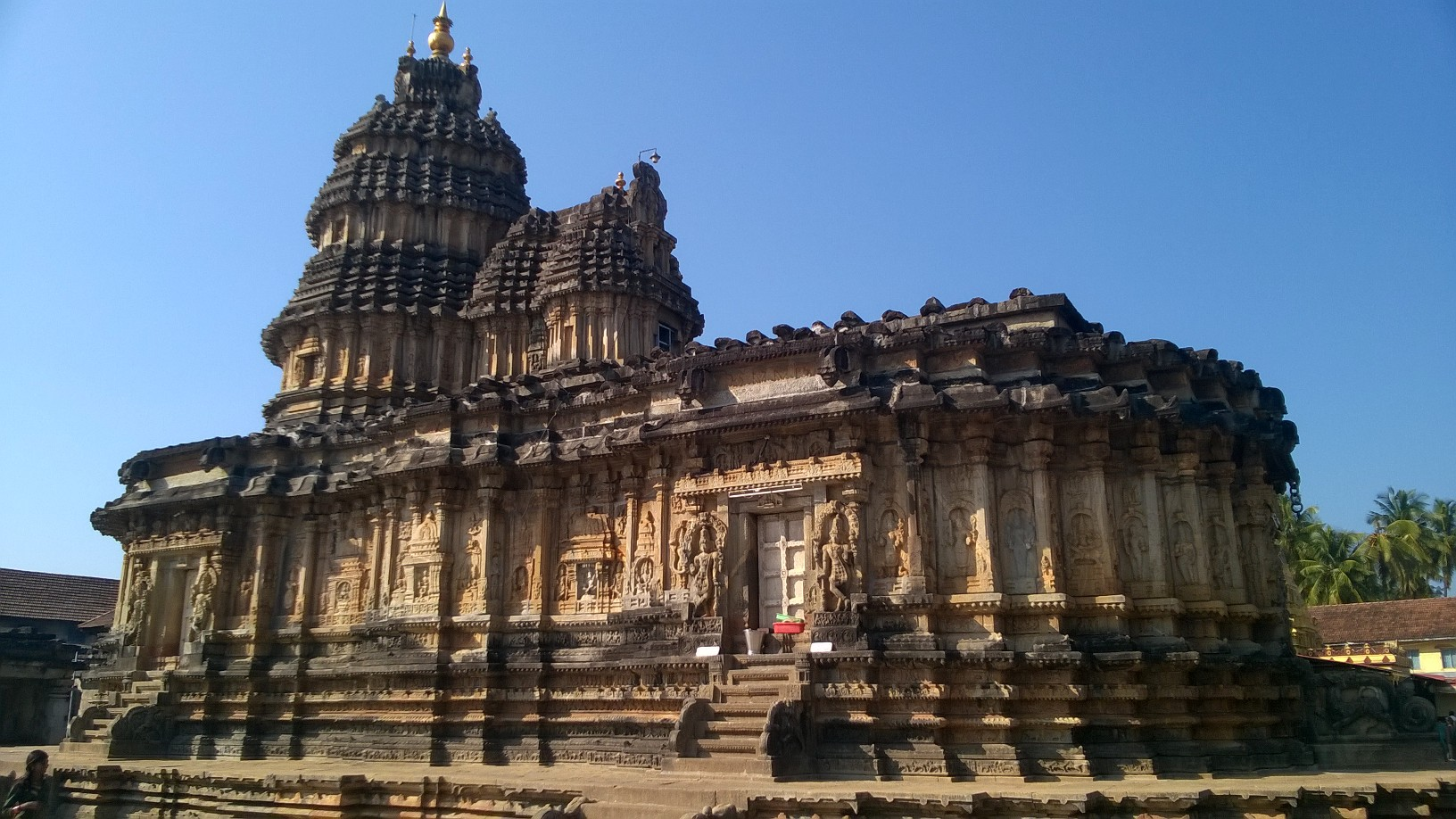
Advaita Vedanta Monastery (Sringeri, Karnataka)

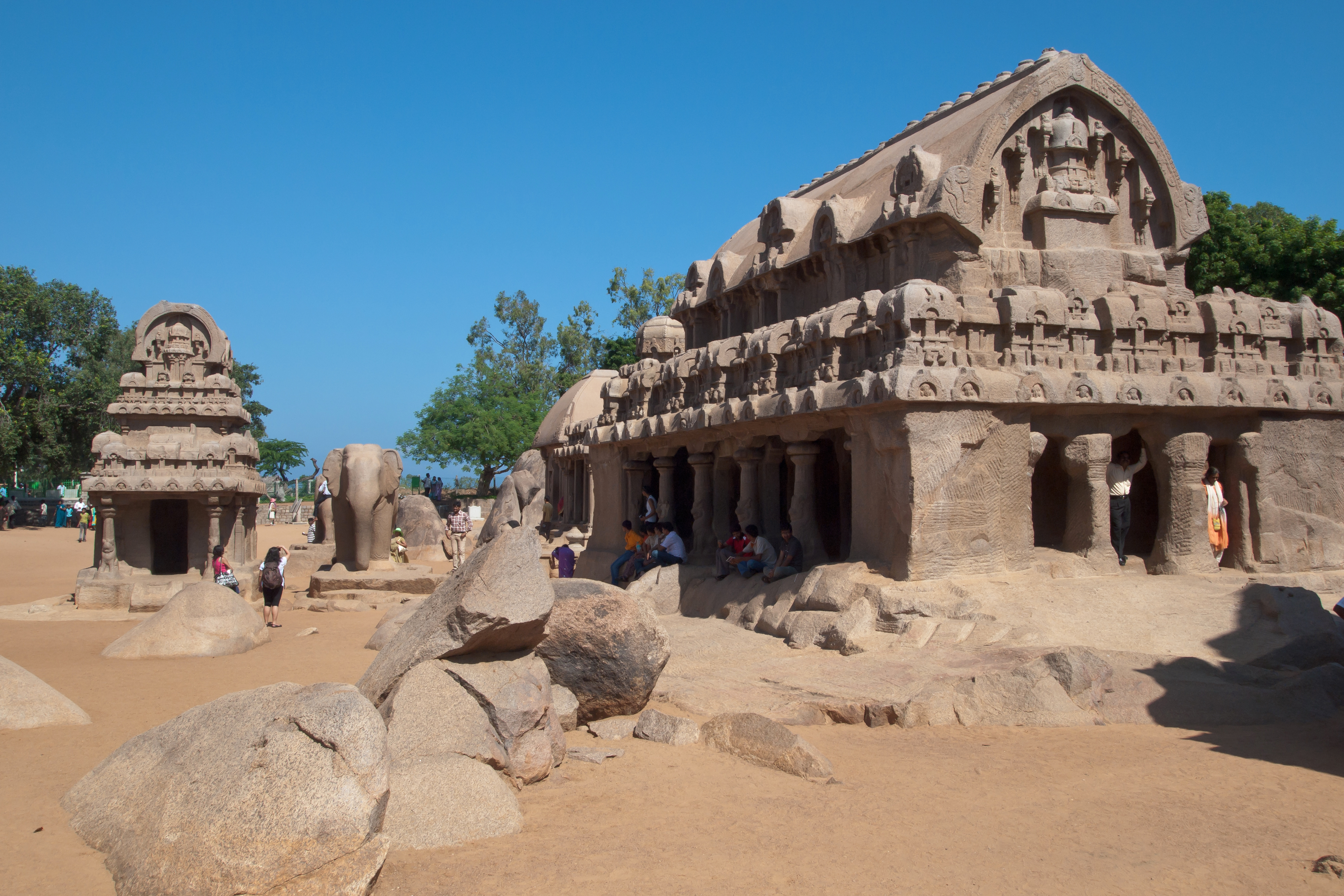
Pancha Rathas (Mahabalipuram, Tamil Nadu)

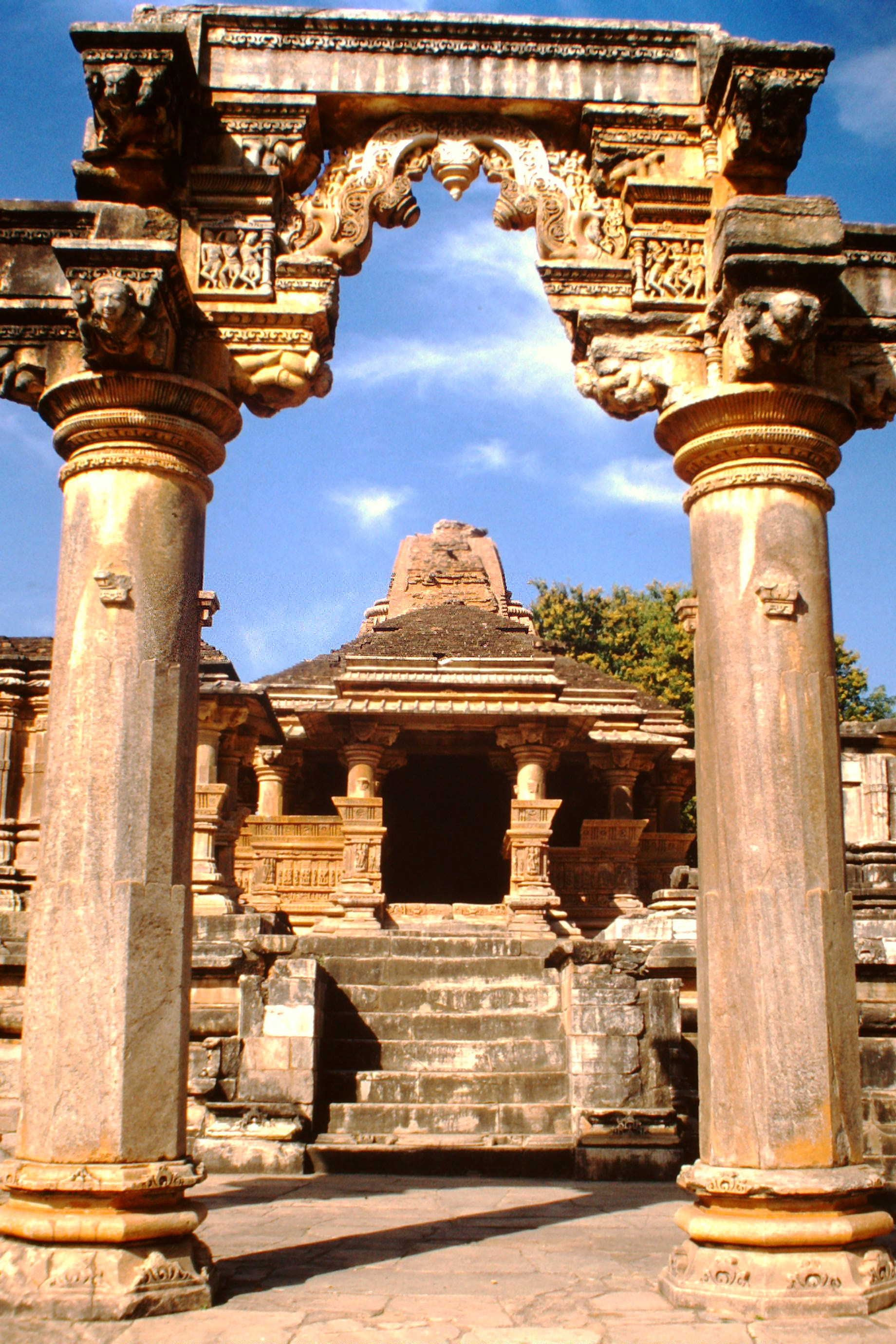
Sahasra Bahu Temples Torana (Nagda, Rajasthan)

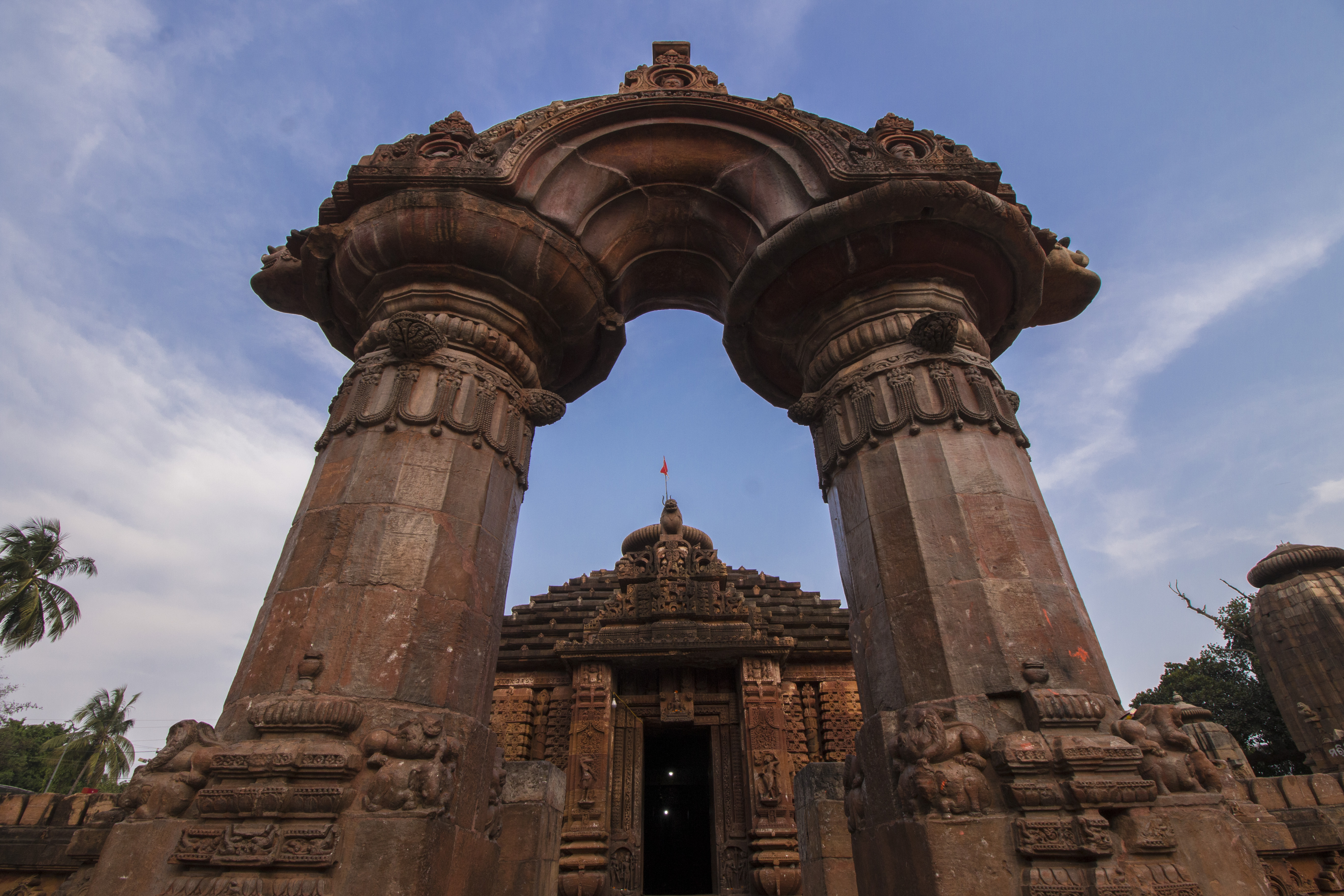
Torana of Mukteshvara Temple, Bhubaneswar (Orisha)

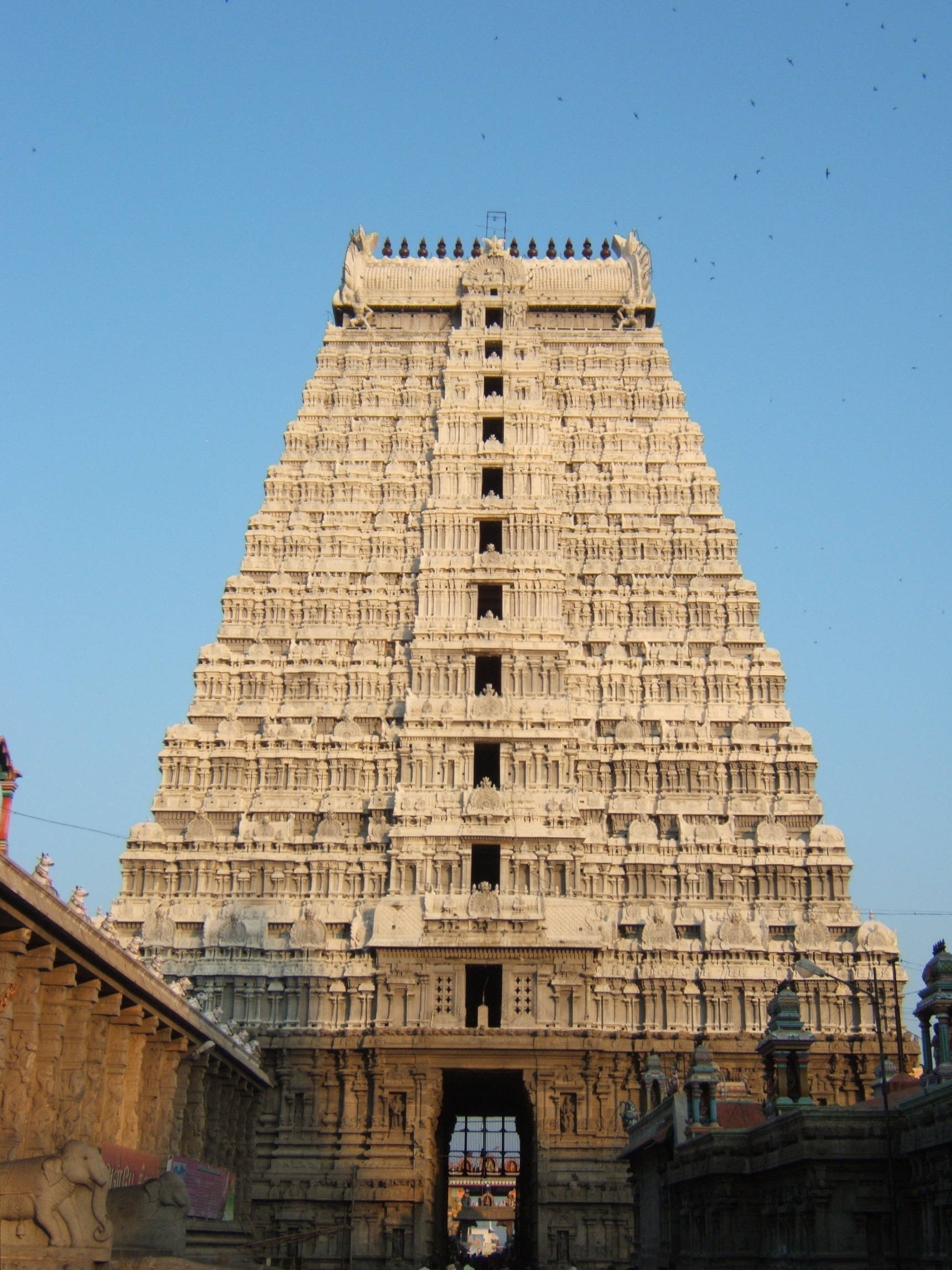
A gopuram at the Arunachaleshvara Temple, Tiruvannamalai (Tamil Nadu)

== See also ==
- Hindu temple architecture
- Indian rock-cut architecture
- Indian architecture
- Dravidian architecture
- Nagara architecture

== Bibliography ==
- Acharya, P. K. (2010). An encyclopaedia of Hindu architecture. New Delhi: Oxford University Press (Republished by Motilal Banarsidass). ISBN 978-81-85990-03-3.
- Acharya, P. K. (1927). Indian Architecture according to the Manasara Shilpa Shastra. London: Oxford University Press (Republished by Motilal Banarsidass). ISBN 0300062176.
- Dhar, P. D. (2010). The Torana in Indian and Southeast Asian Architecture. New Delhi: D K Printworld. ISBN 978-8124605349.
- Glushkova, I. (2014). Objects of Worship in South Asian Religions: Forms, Practices and Meanings. Routledge. ISBN 978-1-317-67595-2.
- Goel, S. R. (1991). Hindu Temples – What Happened to Them. Vol. 2. New Delhi: Voice of India. ISBN 81-85990-03-4.
- Harle, J. C. (1994). The Art and Architecture of the Indian Subcontinent (2nd ed.). Yale University Press Pelican History of Art. ISBN 0300062176.
- Ernest Havell (1972). The Ancient and Medieval Architecture of India. John Murray, London (Reprinted S. Chand).
- Juneja, M. (2001). Architecture in Medieval India: Forms, Contexts, Histories (2nd ed.). Orient Blackswan. ISBN 978-8178242286.
- Michell, G. (1988). The Hindu Temple: An Introduction to its Meaning and Forms (2nd ed.). Chicago/London: University of Chicago Press. ISBN 0-226-53230-5.
- Patra, Reena (2006). "A Comparative Study on Vaastu Shastra and Heidegger's 'Building, Dwelling and Thinking'". Asian Philosophy. 16 (3). Taylor & Francis: 199–218. doi:10.1080/09552360600979430. S2CID 144592593.
- Ram Raz (1834). Essay on the Architecture of the Hindús. Royal Asiatic Society of Great Britain and Ireland.
- Shilpa Sharma; Shireesh Deshpande (2017). "Architectural Strategies Used in Hindu Temples to Emphasize Sacredness". Journal of Architectural and Planning Research. 34 (4): 309–319. JSTOR 44987239.
- Sinha, Amita (1998). "Design of Settlements in the Vaastu Shastras". Journal of Cultural Geography. 17 (2). Taylor & Francis: 27–41. doi:10.1080/08873639809478319.
- Shukla, D. N. (1993). Vastu-Sastra: Hindu Science of Architecture. Munshiram Manoharial Publishers. ISBN 978-81-215-0611-3.
- Sears, T. (2014). Worldly Gurus and Spiritual Kings: Architecture and Asceticism in Medieval India. Yale University Press. ISBN 978-0-300-19844-7.
- Thapar, B. (2004). Introduction to Indian Architecture. Singapore: Periplus Editions. ISBN 0-7946-0011-5.
