= Poncho (disambiguation) =

A poncho is an outer garment for keeping the body warm.

Poncho or PONCHO may also refer to:

- Poncho (video game), an action game developed by Delve Interactive
- PONCHO, a non-profit corporation in Seattle
- Frank Sampedro, American musician known as "Poncho"
- Carlos Miguel Suarez, Mexican actor known as "Poncho"

== See also ==
- Pancho (disambiguation)
- Pancha (disambiguation)
