= Siddha medicine =

Traditional medicine system originating in southern India

Siddha medicine is a form of traditional medicine originating in southern India. It is one of the oldest systems of medicine in India. The Indian Medical Association regards Siddha medicine degrees as "fake" and Siddha therapies as quackery, posing a danger to national health due to absence of training in science-based medicine. Identifying fake medical practitioners without qualifications, the Supreme Court of India stated in 2018 that "unqualified, untrained quacks are posing a great risk to the entire society and playing with the lives of people without having the requisite training and education in the science from approved institutions".

In rural India, siddhars have learned methods traditionally through master-disciple relationships to become local "healers" known as siddhars. Siddhars are among an estimated 400,000 traditional healers practicing medicine in India, comprising some 57% of rural medical care. Siddha practitioners believe that five basic elements – earth, water, fire, air, sky – are in food, "humours" of the human body, and herbal, animal or inorganic chemical compounds, such as sulfur and mercury, used as therapies for treating diseases.

The Ministry of Ayurveda, Yoga and Naturopathy, Unani, Siddha and Homoeopathy of the Government of India regulates training in Siddha medicine and other traditional practices grouped collectively as AYUSH. The Tamil Nadu Dr. M.G.R Medical University offers courses with advanced degrees, such as BSMS (Bachelor in Siddha Medicine and Surgery), MD (Medical Doctor, Siddha) or Doctor of Philosophy (PhD). The Central Council of Indian Medicine, a statutory body established in 1971 under AYUSH, monitors education in areas of Indian traditional medicine, including Siddha medicine. Siddha degree holders can become registered Siddha practitioners and are allowed to prescribe drugs as per the standards recorded in the Siddha Pharmacopoeia of India (SPI) under the Drugs & Cosmetics Act, 1940. However, modern medicine prescriptions by Siddha practitioners are also considered as quackery by the Indian Medical Association.

== History ==
Siddha is an ancient Indian traditional treatment system which evolved in South India, chiefly in Tamil Nadu. According to ancient literature of Siddha, it is said that the system of this medicine originated from Hindu God Shiva who taught it to his consort Parvati. Parvati then passed it on to Nandi and Nandi taught about it to nine Devtas.

Though the origin of this system is considered to be divine, Siddhar Agasthyar is considered as the founding father of this medical system. There are 18 prominent siddhars who are the main contributors to this system of medicine. The original texts and treatise for siddha are written in Tamil language.

== Concept of disease and cause ==
Siddha views disease as a condition caused when the normal equilibrium of the three humors (collectively called mukkuttram) – vaadham (airy), pittham (fiery) and kapam (watery) – is disturbed. The factors assumed to affect this equilibrium are environment, climatic conditions, diet, physical activities, and stress. Under normal conditions, the ratio between Vaadham, Pittham, and Kapam are 4:2:1, respectively.

According to the Siddha medicine system, diet and lifestyle play a major role in health and in curing diseases. This concept of the Siddha medicine is termed as pathiyam and apathiyam, which is essentially a rule-based system with a list of "do's and don'ts".

== Herbalism ==
The herbal agents used by the siddhars could be classified into three groups: thavaram (herbal product), thadhu (inorganic substances) and jangamam (animal products). The thadhu agents are further classified as: uppu (water-soluble inorganic substances that give out vapour when put into fire), pashanam (agents not dissolved in water but emit vapour when fired), uparasam (similar to pashanam but differ in action), loham (not dissolved in water but melt when fired), rasam (substances which are soft), and ghandhagam (substances which are insoluble in water, like sulphur).

== Siddha today ==
Tamil Nadu state runs a 5.5-year course in Siddha medicine (BSMS: Bachelor in Siddha Medicine and Surgery). The Indian Government also gives its focus on Siddha, by starting up medical colleges and research centers like National Institute of Siddha. and Central Council for Research in Siddha. Commercially, Siddha medicine is practiced by siddhars referred in Tamil as vaithiyars.

== Regulation ==
Practicing Siddha medicine and similar forms of rural alternative medicine in India was banned in the Travancore-Cochin Medical Practitioners' Act of 1953, then reinforced in 2018 by the Supreme Court of India which stated that "A number of unqualified, untrained quacks are posing a great risk to the entire society and playing with the lives of people." The Act requires that qualified medical practitioners be trained at a recognized institution, and be registered and displayed on a list of valid physician practitioners, as published annually in The Gazette of India. The Gazette list does not recognize practitioners of Siddha medicine because they are not trained, qualified or registered as valid physicians.

== Criticism ==
Since 2014, the Supreme Court of India and Indian Medical Association have described Siddha medicine as quackery, and there is no governmental recognition of siddhars as legitimate physicians. The Indian Medical Association regards the Indian institutions that train people in Siddha medicine, the supposed degrees granted, and the graduates of those programs as "fake". Since 1953, the Indian national government has not recognized Siddha medicine or any alternative system of medicine as valid, and there is no proposal to integrate Siddha medicine into conventional medicine practiced in India.

There may be as many as one million quack "doctors", including siddhars, practicing medicine in the rural regions of India, a condition not actively opposed by the Indian government out of concern for serving some health needs for the large rural population. The Indian Medical Association emphatically opposed this position in 2014. In 2018, licensed Indian physicians staged demonstrations and accused the government of sanctioning quackery by proposing to allow rural quacks to practice some aspects of clinical medicine without having complete medical training.

== See also ==
- Yoga
- Naturopathy
- Sowa Rigpa
- Tattva (Siddha medicine)
- Lehyam
- Manual therapy
