= Panchayat (disambiguation) =

The Panchayat is a political system, originating from the Indian subcontinent, found mainly in India, Pakistan, Bangladesh, Sri Lanka, and Nepal.

Panchayat may also refer to:

- Panchayat (Nepal), the political system of Nepal from 1960 to 1990
- Panchayati raj in India, official system of local self-government of villages in rural India, introduced by constitutional amendment in 1992
  - Panchayat samiti, rural local governments (panchayats) at the intermediate level in panchayat raj institutions (PRI)
  - Nyaya panchayat, a system of dispute resolution at village level in India
  - Gram panchayat, the grassroots-level of panchayati raj formalised local self-governance system in India
- Panchayat (film), a 2017 Nepalese film
- Panchayat (TV series), an Indian web series
- Panchayat (1996 film), an Indian Punjabi film by Surinder Walia, starring Yograj Singh

== See also ==
- Pancha (disambiguation)
- Ayat (disambiguation)
- Panchayatana (disambiguation)
- Panchayats (Extension to Scheduled Areas) Act, 1996, an act of the Parliament of India, amending the constitution
- Panchayat forest, type of forest designation in India
- Panchayati Hall, a Hindu temple in Jaipur, India
- Panchayati Times, an Indian media organization
- Panchayati Revolution (1842–45), a revolution in the Sikh Empirear
- Local government in India
- Caste panchayat, based on caste system in India
- Nagar panchayat, a settlement in transition from rural to urban in India
- Sarpanch, head of a panchayat
