= Manasara =

Ancient Sanskrit treatise on Indian architecture

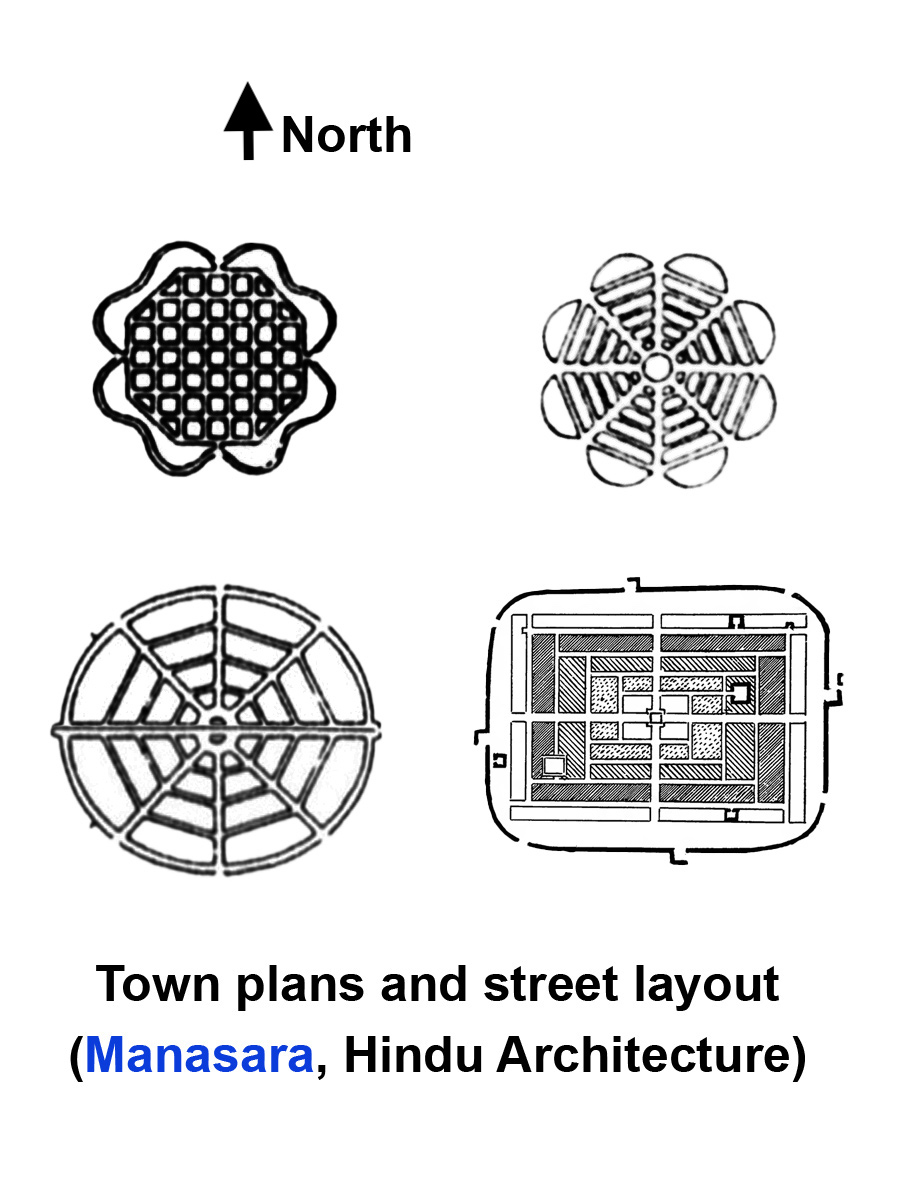
Some town plans recommended in the 700 CE Manasara Sanskrit text on Hindu architecture

The Mānasāra, also known as Manasa or Manasara Shilpa Shastra, is an ancient Sanskrit treatise on Indian architecture and design. Organized into 70 adhyayas (chapters) and 10,000 shlokas (verses), it is one of many Hindu texts on Shilpa Shastra – science of arts and crafts – that once existed in 1st-millennium CE. The Manasara is among the few on Ancient Indian architecture whose complete manuscripts have survived into the modern age. It is a treatise that provides detailed guidelines on the building of Hindu temples, sculptures, houses, gardens, water tanks, laying out of towns and other structures.

== Etymology ==
Manasara is a compound of Sanskrit māna (measurement) and sāra (essence), meaning "essence of measurement" states P.K. Acharya – the scholar who discovered the complete manuscript (70 chapters) and was first to translate it into English in early 20th-century. While the text is now commonly referred as simply Manasara, the Sanskrit manuscript title is Manasara Shilpa Shastra (मानसार शिल्पशस्त्र). Based on the early verses of the partial manuscript (58 chapters) studied in early 19th-century, Ram Raz suggested that the term "Manasara" is better rendered as "the standard measurement" or "the system of proportion". According to Bharne and Krusche, scholars who have written books on Hindu temple and architecture, the complete title Manasara Shilpa Shastra is best understood as "science of architecture where the essence of measurement is contained, the standard measurement is followed, or the system of proportions is embodied".

== Manuscripts and date ==
Indian manuscripts that have survived into the modern age suggest that there once existed a large collection of treatises on architecture, design, arts and crafts. Many are referred and cited in surviving text but they are lost to history or yet to be discovered. Some have survived in portions, over hundred of which PK Acharya has listed in his Encyclopedia of Hindu Architecture. The Manasara is one of the few that have survived in full and has been completely translated.

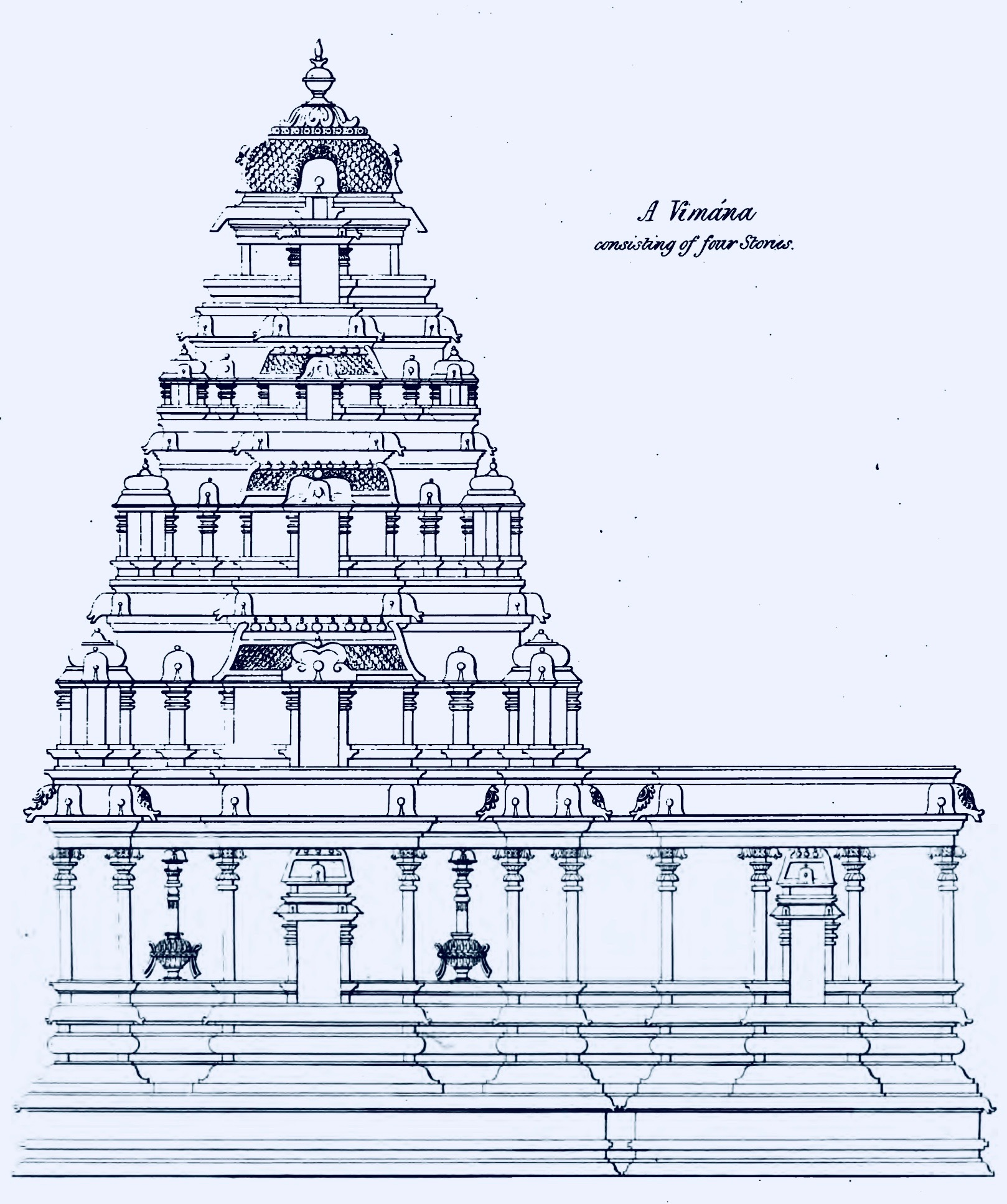
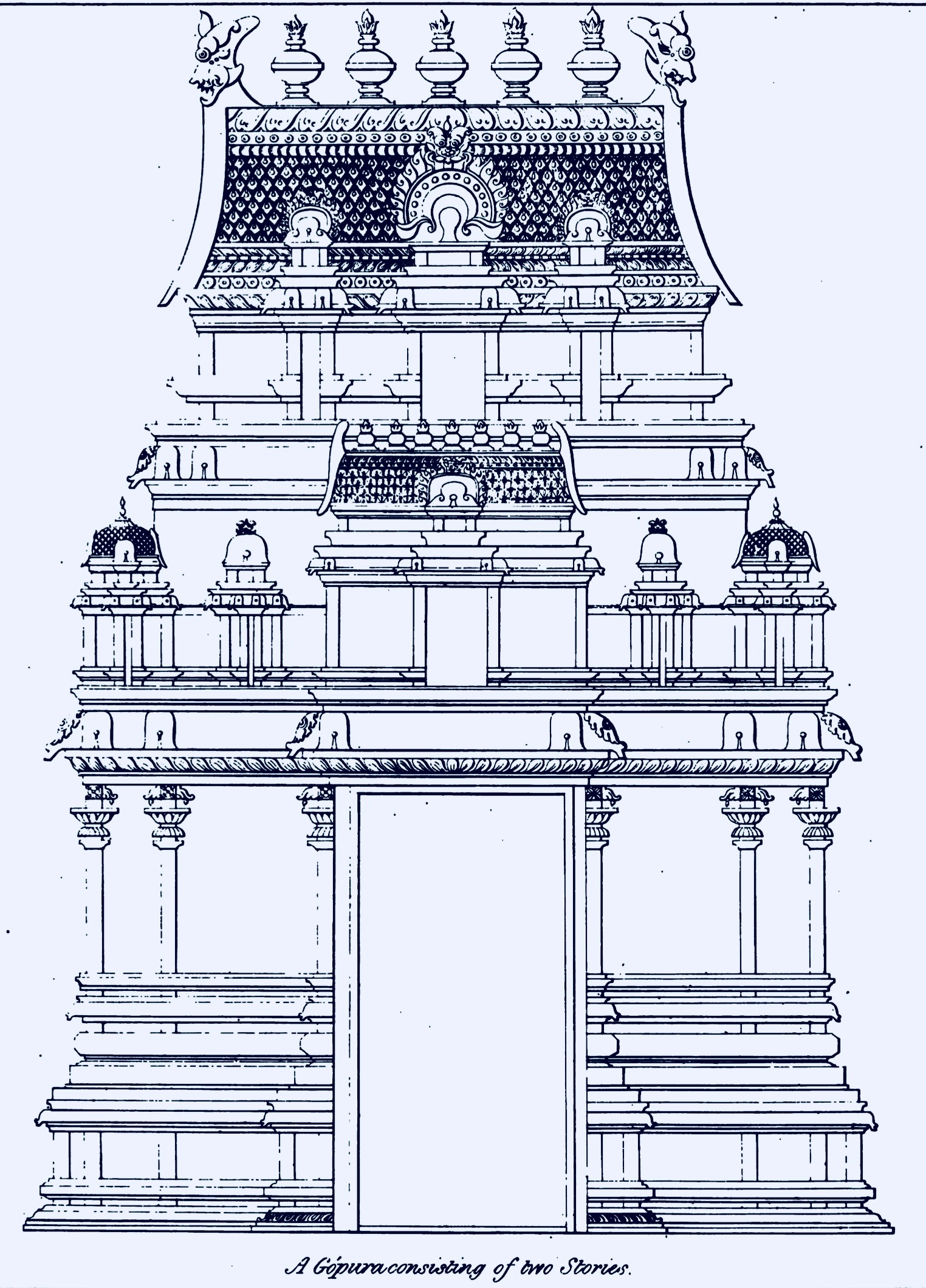
Illustrative sketches of elements in Hindu temple architecture in Ram Raz's study of the Manasara in 1834

Like manuscripts on many notable subjects, the Manasara was believed to have been lost by the 19th-century. Fragments of 58 chapters of the Manasara manuscript in Sanskrit had been found in early 19th-century. Ram Raz had studied these, and published his summary notes in English with interpretations of implied architecture drawings for the western audience.

The British India official Austen Chamberlain had a keen interest in Indian heritage and his efforts to locate ancient Indian manuscripts in early 20th-century resulted in the discovery of 11 Sanskrit manuscripts of Manasara in five Indic scripts, (Note: Of the eleven manuscripts then found, three were in Devanagari script, four were in Grantha script, two in Telugu script, one each in Tamil script and Malayalam scripts. The language of all was Sanskrit. Six were traditional palm leaf manuscripts, while the remaining five were on paper.) in the archives of Hindu temples, only one of which was complete. This complete manuscript found in Tamil Nadu, along with the fragmentary manuscripts, were studied by the Sanskrit scholar Prasanna Acharya to create and publish a critical edition of Manasara manuscript along with a separate glossary of architectural terms. Few years later, in 1934, he published the English translation of the critical edition.

Acharya relied on manuscripts that had no bhasya (commentary) and drawings. However, with assistance of K.S. Siddhalinga Swamy – a traditional shilpin (artist and architect) in South Indian architectural traditions and S.C. Mukherji – another shilpin fluent in Sanskrit and trained in the North Indian traditions, Acharya combined the text with a study of major temples, and then published 121 drawings to go with his publications.

Date and author

The Manasara is an ancient text, states Acharya, which was likely in its final form by about 700 CE, or by other estimates around the 5th-century CE. Tarapada Bhattacharya, a historian specializing in Indian arts and crafts, in his book published in 1963, states that the Manasara is best viewed as a "recension of recensions" text that organically evolved over the centuries. It is the work of no single author, and has layers of verses which are from the Gupta period and even more ancient. Other verses and some chapters were likely added to Manasara in later part of the 1st-millennium CE and the 11th-century CE as Hindu temples grew in their grandeur. Bhattacharya admits that this hypothesis can neither directly be disproved or proved, but submits that this can be inferred from the fact that the architectural teachings in Manasara borrow from and are identical or essentially similar to those found in Sanskrit Puranas, Agamas and Brihatsamhita that have been dated by scholars to about mid-1st millennium CE. It is likely, states Bhattacharya, that the complete surviving manuscript of Manasara is a recension produced in South India around or after the 11th-century based on major treatises that now exist only in fragments.

George Michell, an Indologist known for his many books on Hindu temples, art and architecture, dates the text to 7th to 8th-century CE.

== Scope and contents ==
The Manasara is one of the texts in a collection called the Vaastu Shastras and Shilpa Shastras. These were design manuals covering the art and science of architecture, typically mixing form, function with Hindu symbolism. The earliest, archaic and distilled version of Hindu architecture principles are found in the Sthapatya Veda. The Manasara and related texts – such as Mayamata, Brihatsamhita, Agamas, Casyapa, Vayghamasa, Sacaladhicara, Viswacarmiya, Sanatcamara, Vastumandana, Vastusastra, Vastusara, Ayatattva and others – cover the architectural aspects of a wide range of subjects: ornaments, furniture, vehicles (wagons, carts), gateways, water tanks, drains, cities, streets, homes, palaces, temples and others.

The Manasara consists of 10,000 verses in Sanskrit. These cover a range of architectural topics within the tradition of Hinduism.

Manasara
| Chapter | Verses | Topics |
| 1 | 40 | saṃgraha: a brief list of contents (predominantly Hindu topics, verse 31–32 mention Jaina and Buddhist arts) |
| 2 | 80 | śilpi-lakṣaṇa: Qualifications of Architects, mānopakaraṇa: the system of Measurement |
| 3 | 34 | Vāstu-prakaraṇa: objects of architecture |
| 4 | 42 | bhūmi-saṃgraha: selection of construction site |
| 5 | 91 | bhūparīkṣā: procedures for testing the soil |
| 6 | 120 | śaṅku-sthāpana-lakṣaṇa: Rules for gnomoms and pegs |
| 7 | 271 | padavinyāsa-lakṣaṇa: Ground plans |
| 8 | 88 | balikarma: offerings and puja before planning and construction |
| 9 | 538 | grama: village planning |
| 10 | 110 | nagara: town planning |
| 11 | 145 | bhumilamba: building dimensions |
| 12 | 217 | garbhavinyasa: building foundation |
| 13 | 154 | upapitha: pedestal of columns |
| 14 | 412 | adhisthana: base of columns |
| 15 | 437 | stambha: columns |
| [...] | [...] | [to be added] |
| 40 | 158 | rajaharmya: royal palace |
| 41 | 51 | rajanga: royal entourage |
| 42 | 82 | rajalakshana: royal insignia |
| 43 | 170 | rathalakshana: chariots and chariot-cars |
| 44 | 85 | sayana, paryanka, manca: couch, beds and swings |
| [...] | [...] | [to be added] |
| 51 | 94 | trimurti: Brahma, Vishnu and Mahesha |
| 52 | 376 | Linga: Shaiva icon |
| 53 | 60 | pīṭha-lakṣaṇa: the Hindu temple images, supporting structure for deities |
| 54 | 192 | śakti-lakṣaṇa: the Hindu temple images, female deities |
| 55 | 94 | jaina-lakṣaṇa: the Jaina temple images |
| 56 | 18 | bauddha-lakṣaṇa: the Buddhist temple images |
| 57 | 60 | muni-lakṣaṇa: the images of sages |
| [...] | [...] | [to be added] |
| 70 | 118 | nayanonmilana: rules for the chiseling of the eye |

== Reception ==
Stein published the first review of Acharya's translation of the Manasara manuscript, remarking that the Manasara "seems to occupy the same importance to Shilpa (arts and crafts) like that of the Manusmriti to law" among the Hindus. Neither Ram Raz nor Acharya shared Stein's views on the Manasara. They had interviewed numerous native temple architects and artisans, and based on these interviews they considered Manasara to be an important text but not the authority. The oral tradition of the native builders and portions of manuscripts the native architects possessed led both to the view that the architectural tradition in India relied on 32 mukhya (principal) and 32 upa (secondary) architectural texts, along with a different treatise they called the Sacaladhicara. Both Raz and Acharya interpreted the Manasara in light of the fragmented Sacaladhicara treatise available to them.

According to George Michell, the Manasara is one of many building manuals with chapters important to Hindu temple construction history. These works discuss selection of building site, ground plan, merits of different construction materials, proportion between plans and elevation, and details of the reliefs and decorations seen in Hindu temples.

Contemporary reviewers state that the Manasara manuscript attests to the early advancements and literature on architecture in India. These guidelines such as measurements and ratios are precise, but the text leaves much room for diverse interpretations. The palm leaf manuscripts of Manasara do not have any drawings, unlike the current editions and English translations of Manasara that include drawings. According to Tillotson – a historian of Indian architecture, the Manasara "offers a programme for building, and a fairly thorough one at that, but like other text it remains a compilation of words, not of forms. It only tells, it cannot show."

According to Adam Hardy – an Indologist specializing in Hindu architecture and temples, the Manasara is a guide with prescriptions of ratios and rules for design and architecture, like other Vastu sastra texts that have survived. These prescriptions can be interpreted into a variety of drawings and forms after a careful study, but such studies and publications have been rare. Hardy and Salvini illustrate their view by first translating another vastu sastra text Samarāṅgaṇasūtradhāra into English, then deriving mathematical ratios and drawings from it in a manner similar to those of Ram Raz for Manasara. After his study of Samarāṅgaṇasūtradhāra, Hardy remarks the forms and drawings that result are quite similar to Manasara. More specifically, he writes, "interestingly, this very form of all-the-way-down alignment [of temple Vimana] is present to a large degree in the interpretations of the Mānasāra", as presented in Ram Raz's publication. The Manasara and other texts present the theory, the architect interprets and projects it into a tangible form following the training and field experience he must have received in the architectural traditions. Hardy shares the Tillotson view that some creative attempts with hybrid drawings by Acharya derived from Manasara do not reflect any real buildings from the past or early 20th-century.

The Manasara is the "best-known and possibly the most complete" treatise on Indian architecture and planning that has survived into the modern age, states Jennifer Howes. Its first complete manuscript was discovered in a temple in Thanjavur (Tamil Nadu) in early 20th-century, and as a result the early illustrations and translations give a distinct South Indian style and a context of Hindu temples. This history and context is perhaps why, states Howes, it is often incorrectly "billed as more relevant to studies of temple architecture than to architecture serving any other function". A more cohesive analysis of Manasara suggests it is a broader design and architecture treatise on a wide range of "man-made things".

== Bibliography ==
- Acharya, P. K. (2010). An encyclopaedia of Hindu architecture. New Delhi: Oxford University Press (Republished by Motilal Banarsidass). ISBN 978-81-85990-03-3.
- Acharya, P. K. (1927). Indian Architecture according to the Manasara Shilpa Shastra. London: Oxford University Press (Republished by Motilal Banarsidass). ISBN 0300062176.
- Acharya, P. K. (1934). Architecture of Manasara, Translated from Original Sanskrit. Oxford University Press (Republished by Oriental Books, 2nd edition in 1980).
- Tarapada Bhattacharyya (1963). The Canons of Indian Art: Or, a Study on Vāstuvidyā, 2nd Edition. Firma KLM. ISBN 978-0-8364-1618-3.
- Harle, J. C. (1994). The Art and Architecture of the Indian Subcontinent (2nd ed.). Yale University Press Pelican History of Art. ISBN 0300062176.
- Hardy, Adam (2009). "Drāvida Temples in the Samarānganasūtradhāra" (PDF). South Asian Studies. 25 (1). Routledge: 41–62. doi:10.1080/02666030.2009.9628698. ISSN 0266-6030. S2CID 15290721.
- Ernest Havell (1972). The Ancient and Medieval Architecture of India. John Murray, London (Reprinted S. Chand).
- Jennifer Howes (2003). The Courts of Pre-colonial South India: Material Culture and Kingship. Routledge. ISBN 978-0-7007-1585-5.
- Juneja, M. (2001). Architecture in Medieval India: Forms, Contexts, Histories (2nd ed.). Orient Blackswan. ISBN 978-8178242286.
- Michell, George (1988). The Hindu Temple: An Introduction to its Meaning and Forms (2nd ed.). Chicago/London: University of Chicago Press. ISBN 0-226-53230-5.
- George Michell (2000). Hindu Art and Architecture. Thames & Hudson. ISBN 978-0-500-20337-8.
- Patra, Reena (2006). "A Comparative Study on Vaastu Shastra and Heidegger's 'Building, Dwelling and Thinking'". Asian Philosophy. 16 (3). Taylor & Francis: 199–218. doi:10.1080/09552360600979430. S2CID 144592593.
- Ram Raz (1834). Essay on the Architecture of the Hindús. Royal Asiatic Society of Great Britain and Ireland.
- Sinha, Amita (1998). "Design of Settlements in the Vaastu Shastras". Journal of Cultural Geography. 17 (2). Taylor & Francis: 27–41. doi:10.1080/08873639809478319.
- Shukla, D. N. (1993). Vastu-Sastra: Hindu Science of Architecture. Munshiram Manoharial Publishers. ISBN 978-81-215-0611-3.
