= Pancho (disambiguation) =

Pancho is a nickname, forename, and surname.

Pancho may also refer to:

- Los Panchos, a Latin pop trio
- Pancho's Mexican Buffet, a restaurant chain
- Pancho Lake, Idaho
- Pancho Aréna, a stadium, primarily for football, in Felcsút, Hungary

== See also ==
- Pancha (disambiguation)
- Poncho (disambiguation)
