= Caste panchayat =

Caste-specific juries in India

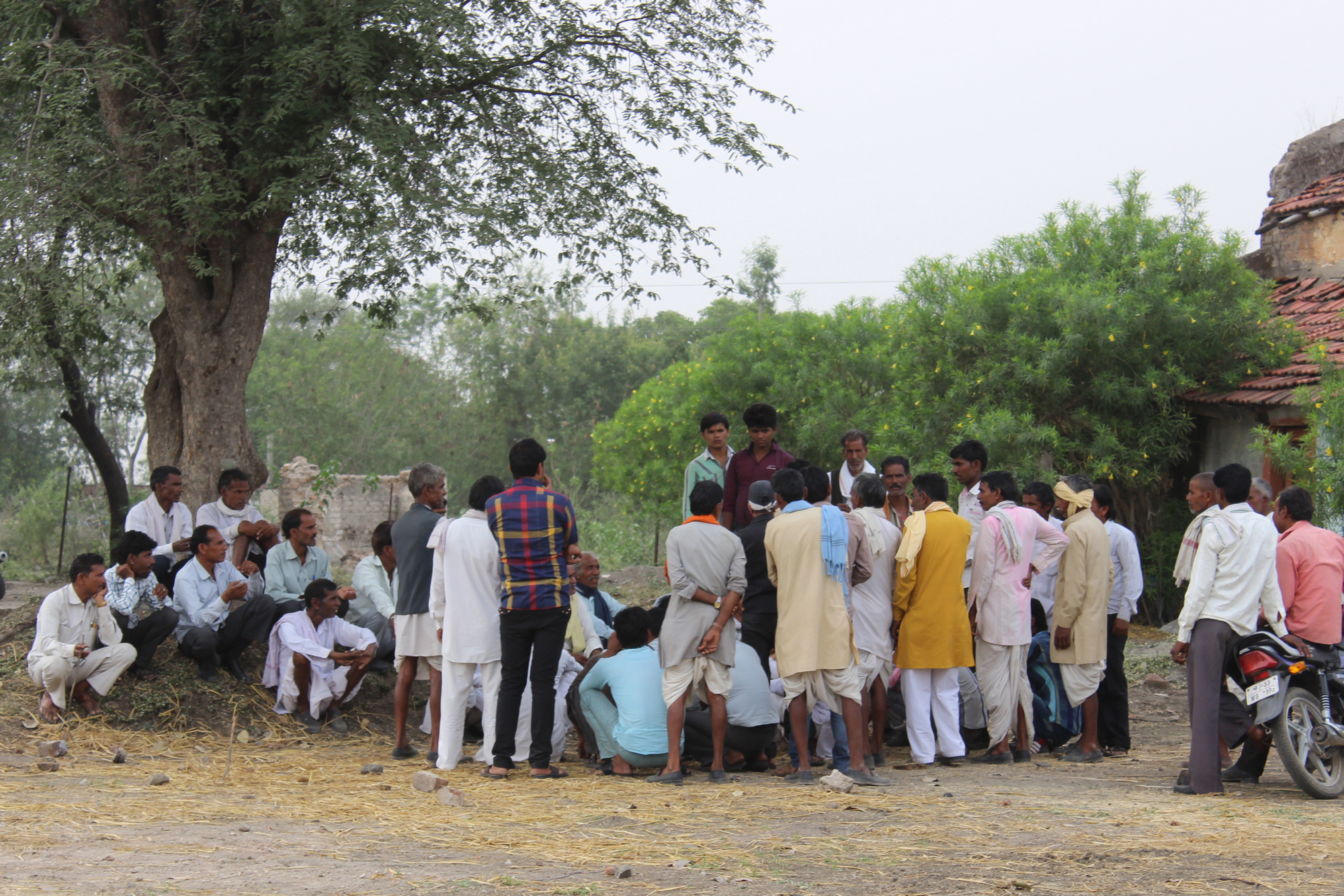
A panchayat near Narsinghgarh, Madhya Pradesh, India

Caste panchayats, based on caste system in India, are caste-specific juries of elders for villages or higher-level communities in India. They are distinct from gram panchayats in that the latter, as statutory bodies, serve all villagers regardless of caste as a part of the Indian government, although they operate on the same principles. A panchayat could be permanent or temporary.

The term panchayat implies a body of five (Sanskrit: panch) individuals, although the number may vary in practice. The number is kept odd to ensure there is no tie when a decision is made. Panchayat members are appointed by consensus.

== History ==
Panchayats, the council of five elders, had existed since Vedic period (c. 1500 – c. 600 BCE) from the times of Ramayana and Mahabharata. Kautilya (Chanakya) also provides the 4th century BCE description of decentralised autonomous governing organisation for each village based on the council of five where the king ruled the empire based on the conglomeration of villages. The earliest mention in English of Panchayats was made by Ram Raz in a letter to H.S. Graeme of the Madras Council around 1828.

Historical mentions of panchayats include the Parsi Panchayat in 1818, the Aror Bans Panchayat at Lahore in 1888, Dalit panchayats in 1907, and the Prachin Agrawal Jain Panchayat of Delhi, founded in the late 19th century, which runs Delhi's famous Bird Hospital and some of its oldest temples.

== Caste panchayat versus Gram panchayat ==
There are different types of panchayats.

Gram panchayat or sabha (village councils) were usually controlled by the elected members of panchayats for maintaining the social order and the resolution of criminal and civil disputes. There were also panchayats for resolving inter-caste conflicts. Gram panchayats were legally formalised under the panchayati raj system as a decentralised grassroot form of local governance.

Caste panchayats (caste councils) have members of particular castes who follow caste-based social norms, rules, religious values and settle conflict among its own members. Each caste, including upper castes and dalits, had own caste panchayat. They repair wells, organise festivals, look after the sick of their castes. These caste panchayats existed as the form of local governance much before the gram panchayats came into being.

== Urban caste panchayat ==
A 1992 study on twenty different low caste Telugu immigrant communities in Pune, found evolution of caste panchayat of each community into three different types in their new urban setting:

- Fused caste panchayats: those with characteristics similar to the traditional caste panchayats in villages.
- Transitional caste panchayats: those where the characteristics of traditional village caste panchayats and modern organisations coexist.
- Differentiated caste panchayats: those more adopted to the changing modern conditions with diminished traditional characteristics and modern organisational characteristics projected outside.

== Responsibilities ==
Traditionally, panchayats have adjudicated disputes involving caste members in open meetings. The issues brought before these bodies can include: managing temples and schools, property disputes, marital relations, and breaches of community rules (such as extravagant spending on weddings or the eating, drinking, or killing of certain animals, such as cows). Penalties include monetary fines, offering a feast to the caste members or to Brahmins, or temporary or permanent excommunication from the caste. Pilgrimage and self-humiliation are also occasionally imposed. Physical punishment was levied on occasion but is now uncommon.

When the Evidence Act was passed in 1872, some caste members began to take their cases before civil or criminal courts rather than have them adjudicated by the caste panchayat. Nevertheless, these bodies still exist and exert leadership roles within their respective groups.

== Khap ==
A Khap is a clan, or a group of related clans, mainly among the Jats of western Uttar Pradesh, Haryana, Rajasthan, Gujarat and some parts of Madhya Pradesh. The term has also been used in other communities. A Khap panchayat is an assembly of Khap elders, and a Sarv Khap (literally, "all Khaps") meeting is an assembly of many Khaps. A Khap panchayat is concerned with the affairs of the Khap it represents. It is not affiliated with the democratically elected local assemblies that are also termed panchayat, and has no official government recognition or authority, but it can exert significant social influence within a community. Baliyan Khap, led by the late farmer's leader Mahendra Singh Tikait, is a well-known Jat Khap.

== Movies ==
Izzatnagari Ki Asabhya Betiyaan is a highly acclaimed documentary film (Hindi) directed by Nakul Singh Sawhney. The film is based on the true and poignant story of five Jat girls from Haryana who raised their voice against the arbitrary decrees of Khap Panchayats and the evils like honour killings.
