= Tattvasaṃgraha =

There are two texts in Tibetan Buddhism that bear the name 'Tattvasaṃgraha':

- Tattvasamgraha of Shantarakshita, a survey of Buddhist and non-Buddhist philosophical views (tenets, Tib. sgrub-mtha)
- Tattvasaṃgraha Tantra, the foremost text of the Yoga Tantra class of tantras

== See also ==
- Tattva (disambiguation)
