= Travancore-Cochin Medical Practitioners Act, 1953 =

Travancore-Cochin Legislative Assembly
- Citation: Act IX of 1953
- Territorial extent: Travancore-Cochin
- Enacted by: Travancore-Cochin Legislative Assembly

Repealed by
- Kerala State Medical Practitioners Act, 2021
- Status: Repealed

The Travancore Cochin Medical Practitioners Act, 1953 regulates the qualifications and provides registration for medical doctors qualified in modern medicine, homeopathic medicine and indigenous medicine. At the time of enactment, it extended to the state of Travancore-Cochin, which later became Kerala state. The Act directs the establishment of the Council of Modern Medicine (with 9 members), Council of Homeopathic medicine (5 members) and the council of indigenous medicine (11 members). This Act allows giving registration for practicing medicine to those registered under this Act. The practitioners registered under this Act will be listed in a registry. The annual list of practitioners is published in gazettes. Practitioners registered under this Act are allowed to use the words legally qualified medical practitioner or duly qualified medical practitioner.
