= Pancha Tattva =

Pancha Tattva may refer to:

- Pancha Bhuta, five basic elements in Hinduism
- Panchatattva (Tantra), elements in Tantra
- Pancha Tattva (Vaishnavism), aspects of divinity in the Vaishnavism sect of Hinduism

== See also ==
- Pancha (disambiguation)
- Tattva (disambiguation)
