= Paola Villaseñor =

Paola Villaseñor (born 1986), better known by her nickname Panca, is a painter, muralist, street artist and illustrator born in San Diego, CA, US. Thematically, her work focuses on the dichotomy and decay of humanity using neon and pastel colors, grotesque figures and distorted shapes. She has been working between Mexico and the United States since 2004 making wheat-paste art, indoor murals, large scale outdoor murals and paintings on various different surfaces.

== Early life ==
Panca was born in San Diego, Ca in 1986. She emigrated from the neighborhood of Chula Vista to Tijuana, MX in 2004 at the age of 18.

== Selected works ==
The Museum of Contemporary Art San Diego selected Panca to host an event in "Made by X" series in March 2018.

The Artist Odyssey Featured Panca in their first international film titled "Panca", screened at the San Diego Art Institute November 2, 2016.

Panca created a large scale site specific mural at Bread and Salt in May 2017.

"The Savagery of Women" (site specific mural) was displayed in the entry way of the San Diego Art Institute as part of their winter benefit in 2015.

== Exhibitions ==
¿Porque no eres una niña normal? an exhibition of original works by Panca, was shown at Bread and Salt, San Diego April 8 to June 16, 2017.

New Contemporaries 2016 SD Art Prize Emerging Nominated Artists was shown at the San Diego City College Gallery, June 18- July14th, 2016

== Awards ==
Panca was nominated by Alex Zaragoza for the San Diego Art Prize in 2016 as an Emerging Artist.
