= Ram Raz =

Ram Raz (Rama Raja) (c. 1790–1833) was a native judge in Bangalore and an Indian scholar who translated Sanskrit sources and wrote one of the first works on Indian architecture which was published posthumously by the Royal Asiatic Society in London in 1834 as Essay on the Architecture of the Hindus. A corresponding member of the Royal Asiatic Society, he also contributed to the establishment of English systems of adjudication in southern India.

== Life ==
Ram Raz was born in Tanjore in a poor family but mastered English while working as a clerk with the 2nd Battalion of the 16th Madras Native Infantry Regiment. He then became a vakil. Around 1815 he was a clerk in the office of the English Military Auditor General. He helped translate Tipu Sultan's code of regulations for revenue officers from Marathi to English. As his abilities came to be known, he came to be appointed head English master at the college of Fort St. George in Madras. Later he was appointed to the position of Native Judge in the Hoossor Adawlut (Huzur Adalat) in Bangalore, Mysore state, where he worked for 23 years. Little is known of him but he was described as of small and delicate frame. He claimed that he was named after an ancestor who was a King of Vijayanagar. He died sometime before 1833, the Bangalore climate said to have been unsuitable for him. He was married, had a daughter and lived with his widowed mother.

== Career ==
Because of his knowledge of English, he was consulted by H.S. Graeme of the Madras Council of the East India Company around 1827-1827 about the views of Indians on accepting trial by jury in criminal and civil cases. In his response he examined what Indians considered of the English judicial system, on Hindu laws, the corruptibility of the system, difficulties for the jury, whether verdicts against Brahmins might be beyond Indian jurors and whether native jurors were capable of taking all matters into consideration while making judgements. He supported the English system and stated that some Hindus would claim that this was actually what Indians used. He noted that Hindus would be opposed to the idea of receiving a sentence from a Muslim judge in English service but stated that trial by jury could gradually gain acceptance. He described the Hindu courts or various kinds of sabhas, the Smriti Chandrica, Yajnyavalya, the Saraswativilasa, Madaviyam, and Dattamimansa. He noted that most people were corruptible but that people could be carefully selected. He noted that Indians did not like travel. He noted that Hindu law did have different punishments according to the caste of the accused but noted that Indian jurors would not be troubled if they only decided the guilt of the accused, especially of Brahmins, and not the actual punishment. It is claimed that the term panchayat was first described by Ram Raz as adopted in the Deccan region.

Ram Raz's Essay on the Architecture of the Hindus was published in 1834 and communicated to Richard Clarke of the Madras Civil Service. The work was based mainly on the Mānasāra but also consulted other texts such as the Mayamata, Csyapa, Vayghansa, Sacaldhicra, Viswacarmya, Sanatcumra, Sraswatyam, and the Pancharatram. He also commissioned several illustrations to go with the book.
