= Tattva (Siddha medicine) =

According to the Siddha system of traditional medicine (Tamil: சித்த மருத்துவம், citta maruttuvam) of ancient India, the human body is composed of 96 tattvas (also thathuvas) or basic principles.

Siddha medicine was derived by Tamil Siddhas or the spiritual scientists of Tamil Nadu. Siddhas fundamental principles never differentiated man from the universe. According to them, "Nature is man and man is nature and therefore both are essentially one. Man is said to be the microcosm and the Universe is Macrocosm, because what exists in the Universe exists in man."

== Matter and energy ==
The Universe comprise two fundamental entities i.e., matter and energy and the Siddhas identified matter as Siva and energy as Shakti. They also identified that matter and energy are co-existing and they cannot be separated.

== Five primordial elements ==
A central concept to samkhya and other Hindu philosophies is the five primordial elements or pancha boothas i.e., earth (solid), water (fluid), fire (radiance), air (gas) and space (akasam). All the matter (both created and evolved) including animal, plants or mineral comes under these five primordial elements. The Siddhas also believed that the human anatomy and physiology, the factors causing disease, the materials used for the treatment and to cure the disease, and food consumed by the living organisms – all of these fall within the five primordial categories.

== Siddha anatomy and physiology ==
The human body is composed of 96 tattvas or basic principles. Al these 96 tatwas fall under 14 broad categories. They include:

1. Five elements,
2. Five objects of senses,
3. Five organs of action,
4. Five organs of perception,
5. Four intellectual faculties,
6. Ten nerves,
7. Five states of the soul,
8. Three principles of moral evil,
9. Three comic qualities, Three humours,
10. Three regions,
11. Eight predominant passions,
12. Six stations of the soul, Seven constituent elements of the body,
13. Ten vital airs, Five cases of the sheaths of the soul,
14. Nine doors or vents of the body.

These basic principles include Physical, Physiological, Mental and Intellectual components of a person. They are nothing but the manifestations of the five primordial elements.

Next to the Tatwas the human body exists of 72000 blood vessels, 13000 nerves and ten main arteries. 4448 diseases can be caused by the derangement of the three humors.
