= Panchayatana =

Panchayatana comes from the Sanskrit pañca 'five' and āyatana 'altar'.

- Panchayatana puja, an act of worship (puja) of five deities: Shiva, Vishnu, Devi, Surya and Ganesha

== Architecture ==
- Pancharatna (architecture) is a style of Bengal temple architecture.
- Panchayatana (temple) is a style of Hindu temple architecture.

=== Geometric ===
- Pancharatnam-Berry phase In classical and quantum mechanics, geometric phase is a phase difference acquired over the course of a cycle.

== See also ==
- Panchayat (disambiguation)
- Pancharatna (disambiguation)
