= Pañcasīla =

Pañcasīla, derived from Pali or Sanskrit pañca (five) and sīla (principles), spelt Panchsheel in modern Indian languages, may refer to:

- Five precepts, the basic form of Buddhist precepts
- Five Principles of Peaceful Coexistence, enunciated by the People's Republic of China with Indian agreement
- Panchsheel Agreement, an Indian term, now obsolete, for the 1954 Sino-Indian Agreement
- Panchsheel Park, a neighbourhood and diplomatic enclave in Delhi, India
  - Panchsheel Park metro station, metro station in Delhi, India
- Panchsheel Nagar district now Hapur district, a district in Uttar Pradesh, India; named after the Five precepts
- Pancasila, the Indonesian state philosophy
